Some notable French Huguenots or people with French Huguenot ancestry include:

Actors and film-makers
James Agee (1909–1955), American screenwriter, Pulitzer Prize-winning author.
René Allio (1924–1995), French film-maker.
Humphrey Bogart (1899–1957), American actor, descended from Huguenot refugees in the Netherlands.
Dion Boucicault (1820–1890), Irish actor and playwright.
Marlon Brando (1924–2004), American actor, descended from  Chretien DuBois of the Comté of Coupigny, near Lille in Artois.
Godfrey Cass (1867-1951), Australian actor, descendant of the Castieau family.
Christopher Cazenove (1943–2010), English actor.
Timothée Chalamet (1995–), French-American actor.
Charlie Chaplin (1889-1977), British actor, likely to have had Huguenot ancestry but this has not yet been fully confirmed.
Cyd Charisse (1921-2008), American actress and dancer.
Jessica Chastain (1977–), American actress, Academy Award winner for Best Actress 2022,  descended from Dr Pierre Chastain who came from near the village of Chârost (his family had earlier lived in Bourges). 
Charles Chauvel (1897–1959), Australian film-maker, ancestors from Blois in the Loire Valley.
William Christopher (1932–2016), American actor.
George Clooney (1961-), American actor, nephew of Rosemary Clooney, descended from the Koch family of Alsace-Lorraine.
Olivia Colman (1974–), English actress, descended from Anne Foissin of Paris.
Gary Cooper (1901-1961), American actor, descended from the Brazier family.
Daniel Craig (1968–), English actor, descended from Pastor Daniel Chamier of Le Mont, near Mocas, west of Grenoble. (Chamier's father, in turn, came from Avignon.)
Joan Crawford (1905–1977), American actress, descended from the Huguenots, Dr Pierre Chastain and Chretien DuBois, on her father's side.
Konstanze Dahn (real name Constanze Le Gaye) (1814-1894), German actress.
Bette Davis (1908-1989), American actress, descended from the Favor family. on her mother's side.
Jean Delannoy (1908–2008), French actor, film editor, screenwriter and film director.
Cara Delevingne (1992-), English actress and model, French Huguenot ancestry.
Poppy Delevingne (1986-), English actress and model, sister of Cara, French Huguenot ancestry.
Cecil B. DeMille (1881-1959), American film-maker.
Johnny Depp (1963–), American actor, descended from Jean and Pierre Dieppe of Dieppe, Normandy.
Lily-Rose Depp (1999-), actress, model, daughter of Johnny Depp, descended from Jean and Pierre Dieppe of Dieppe, Normandy.
Louis de Rochemont (1899–1978), filmmaker.
Richard de Rochemont (1903–1982), filmmaker.
Emil Devrient (1803–1876), German actor.
Ludwig Devrient (1784–1832), German actor.
Brandon De Wilde (1942-1972), American actor.
Brooke D'Orsay (1982–), Canadian actress.
Gerald du Maurier (1873–1934), English actor.
Tilla Durieux (1880–1971), Austrian actress. 
Elize du Toit (1980-), South African actress.
Wikus du Toit (1972-), South African actor and comedian.
Robert Duvall (1931–), actor, descended from Mareen Duvall of Nantes.
Ava Gardner (1922-1990), American actress.
David Garrick (1717–1779), English theatre actor and playwright, descendant  of David de la Garrique from near Saintonge.
Jean-Luc Godard (1930–2022), French film director and film critic, related to the Monod family.
Audrey Hepburn (1929-1993), Belgian-born British actress and humanitarian, descended from Daniel Marot of Paris.
Eddie Izzard, English comedian, actor, family thought to originate in the Pyrenees.
Derek Jacobi (1938–), English actor, descended from the financier Joseph de la Plaigne of Bordeaux.
Dakota Johnson (1989-), American actress and model, daughter of Don Johnson.
Don Johnson  (1949-), American actor.
Val Kilmer (1959-), American actor.
Alice Krige (1954-), South African actress.
Ethel Lavenu (1842-1917), British actress, mother of Tyrone Power and grandmother of Tyrone Power junior, descended from the Huguenots, Hector Francois Chataigner de Cramahé and Salomon Blosset de Loche, both of whom fought for William of Orange.
Zachary Levi (real name: Zachary Pugh) (1980-), American actor and practising Christian, descended from François De Puy of Calais.
Andrew Lincoln (1973-), English actor.
Laurence Olivier (1907–1989), English actor, descendant of Pastor Jerome Olivier, chaplain to the Prince of Orange, family originally from Nay in the Pyrenees.
Valerie Perrine (1943–), American actress, descended from  Daniel Perrin of Normandy. 
Jon Pertwee (1919–1996), English actor, descended from the Perthuis de Laillevault family of Provence. 
Michael Pertwee (1916-1991), playwright and screenwriter, son of Roland Pertwee and brother of Jon Pertwee, descendant of the Perthuis de Laillevault family of Provence.
Roland Pertwee (1885-1963), playwright and screenwriter, father of Jon Pertwee and Michael Pertwee, descended from the Perthuis de Laillevault family of Provence.
Sean Pertwee (1964–), English actor, son of Jon Pertwee, descended from the Perthuis de Laillevault family of Provence.
Joaquin Phoenix (1974-), American actor, distant French Huguenot ancestry on his father's side.
River Phoenix (1970-1993), American actor, brother of Joaquin Phoenix.
Tyrone Power (1914–1958), actor, descended from the Lavenu and Blossett families.
Tyrone Power, Sr. (1869–1931), actor, descended from the Lavenu and Blossett families.
Kate Raison (1962–), Australian actress
Miranda Raison (1977–), English screen and stage actress.
Robert Redford (1936–), American actor, descended from Philippe de La Noye (Philip Delano) of the Leiden Huguenot refugee community (the family originated in Lannoy, near Tourcoing). 
Julia Sawalha (1968–) and Nadia Sawalha (1964–), British actresses of Huguenot and Jordanian ancestry, descended from a Norman silkweaver, Daniel Duboc.
Valerie Schlumberger, retired actress, philanthropist, founder of Empire des enfants charity in Dakar, founder of the boutique Compagnie d'Afrique du Sénégal et de l'Afrique de l'ouest (CSAO), former wife of Henri Seydoux, mother of actress Léa Seydoux.
Jérôme Seydoux, head of Pathé, head of Charges Réunies, shareholder in Olympique Lyonnais Football Club.
Léa Seydoux (1985–), French actress, patron of the charity Empire des enfants, atheist member of the Protestant Schlumberger and Seydoux families. 
Nicolas Seydoux, head of Gaumont.
Delphine Seyrig (1932–1990), actress and film-maker, member of an intellectual Protestant family from Alsace.
Charlize Theron (1975–), South African actress, descended from the pioneering South African farmer, Jacques Therond, originally of Nîmes, Languedoc.
David Thewlis (1963–), English actor.
Hermann Vezin (1829–1910), American actor.
Wil Wheaton (1972-), American actor, atheist with distant Huguenot ancestry from Montserrat  on his mother's side.
Joanne Woodward (1930–), American actress and philanthropist, descended from the Gignilliat family of Switzerland.

Architects
Salomon de Brosse (1571–1626), French architect.
Isaac de Caus (1590-1648), architect, garden designer.
Samuel Fortrey (1622-1681), architect, designer of Kew Palace, descendant of de La Forteries.
James Gandon (1742–1823), Anglo-Irish Georgian architect.
William Grellier (1847–1934),  architect responsible for drawing sections of the French Church in Threadneedle Street, London.
Benjamin Henry Latrobe (1764–1820), British-born architect of the United States Capitol.
Le Corbusier (1887–1965), architect. 
Richard Leplastrier (1939-), Australian architect.
Gabriel Manigault (1758-1809), American architect, descendant of Pierre Manigault from La Rochelle.
Daniel Marot (1661-1752), architect and furniture designer, ancestor of actress Audrey Hepburn.
Gottfried Semper (1803-1879), German architect, art critic.
Samuel Sanders Teulon (1812–1873), British Victorian Architect.
John E. Tourtellotte (1869–1939), American architect.

Artists
Frédéric Auguste Bartholdi (1834-1904), French sculptor, designer of the Statue of Liberty (French Lutheran).
Earl W. Bascom (1906–1995), American artist, sculptor, rodeo cowboy, descendant of Robert Bascom.
Frédéric Bazille (1841–1870), French Impressionist painter. 
Jean Bellette (1908-1991), Tasmanian artist.
Samuel Bernard (1615-1687), French artist.
Abraham Bosse (1604-1676), artist, printmaker.
Sébastien Bourdon (1616–1671), French painter. 
Hablot Knight Browne ("Phiz") (1815–1882), British illustrator of Charles Dickens. 
Louis Buvelot (1814-1888), Swiss-born Australian artist and photographer.
Harold Cazneaux (1878–1953), Australian photographer.
Louis Chéron (1660-1725), artist.
Maximilian Colt (died 1641), sculptor.
Jacques d'Agar (1640-1715), artist.
Jean de Beauchesne (1538-1620), calligrapher.
Nicholas de Larquillière, artist.
William De Morgan, British art potter, tile designer, author.
Louis Dugreur, painter.
Gainsborough Dupont (1754-1797), artist, nephew of Thomas Gainsborough.
Townsend Duryea (1823-1888), American photographer.
Benjamin Duterrau (1767-1851), English-born Tasmanian artist.
Robert Du Val (l639-1732), painter.
Louis Elle, painter.
Véra Fabre (real name Jacqueline Couve De Murville, née Schweisguth) (1912-2002), French abstract artist, wife of Prime Minister Maurice Couve De Murville and heiress of the Protestant families who owned the banking firms, Banque de l'Union Parisienne and Banque Mirabaud.
François Garnier, still-life painter, step-father of Louise Moillon.
Mark Garret, portrait painter.
Isaac Gosset (1713-1799), wax sculptor.
Wilhelm Hugues (1905–1971), German painter and sculptor.
Esther Inglis (1571-1624), calligrapher. 
Pierre-Antoine Labouchère (1807–1873), painter. 
Victor Lardent (1905–1968), British advertising designer who drew Times New Roman.
Louis Laguerre (1663-1721), decorative painter.
Marcellus Laroon (1653-1702), artist.
Marcellus Laroon the Younger (1679–1772), artist.
Max Leenhardt (1853–1941), French artist.
Jacques Le Moyne (1533–1588), French artist, explorer (Laudonniere expedition).
Hubert Le Sueur (1580-1658), sculptor.
Jean-Étienne Liotard (1702–1789), Swiss painter.
Jeanne Lombard (1865–1945), French painter.
Adolph Menzel (1815–1905), artist.
Philip Mercier (1689-1760), portrait painter.
Philip Meusnier, architectural artist.
Girault Michelin, artist.
Jean Michelin (1616-1670), artist, son of Jean Michelin the First and nephew of Girault Michelin.
Louise Moillon (1610-1696), French artist, daughter of Nicolas Moillon.
Nicolas Moillon (1555-1619), French artist.
Henri Nadauld, sculptor.
Karl Oenike (1862-1924), German landscape painter
Isaac Oliver (1565–1617), ornamental and miniatures painter.
Bernard Palissy (1510–1589), French potter. 
William Piguenit (1836–1914), Australian landscape artist. 
Anne Pratt (1806-1893), botanical illustrator.
Marie Presot, calligrapher, mother of Esther Inglis.
Barthélemy Prieur (1536-1611), sculptor.
Frederic Remington, American artist, sculptor
Louis-François Roubiliac (1702–1762), sculptor.
Briton Rivière (1840-1920), English artist of Huguenot descent.
Jacques Rousseau (1630-1693), artist.
Daniel Soreau (died 1743), artist and picture restorer.
John Spencer-Churchill (1909–1992), English painter and sculptor and nephew of Sir Winston Churchill.
John Tenniel (1820–1914), cartoonist. 
Louis Testelin (1615-1655), French artist.
Ernst Gottfried Vivié (1823–1902), sculptor.

Chefs and restauranteurs
Francis Foucachon, chef, pastor, creationist and church-planter.
Erik Le Roux, South African chef, brother of television food show host, Nataniël Le Roux.
Sally Lunn, baker.
Ian Parmenter (1946-), English-born Australian celebrity chef.
Julian Seydoux, founder of Vai Milano ice cream company.
Tigrane Seydoux, founder of "Big Mama" chain of Italian restaurants.
Alexis Soyer (1810–1858), celebrity chef and philanthropist. 
Paul Tremo (1733-1810), the head chef at the court of King Stanislaus Augustus Poniatowski of Poland.

Doctors and medical practitioners
Lou Andreas-Salomé (1861–1937), Russian-born psychoanalyst and author
Charles Angibaud, French-born British apothecary.
Daniel Bovet (1907–1992), pharmacologist, Nobel Prize winner. 
Pierre Bovet (1878-1965), psychologist, translator of Boy Scouts guides into French, co-founder of the Rousseau Institute in Geneva, father of Daniel Bovet. 
Peter Chamberlen, physician, obstetrician, invented delivery via forceps.
Moise Charas, apothecary.
George de Benneville (1702–1793), physician, left Huguenot background for unorthodox religious beliefs.
Jean de Gorris (1505–1577), doctor, academic.
Johannes de la Montagne, physician of New Amsterdam and vice-director of New Netherland
Gideon De Laune (1565-1658), apothecary.
Theodore Turquet de Mayerne, physician.
Campbell De Morgan (1811–1876), British surgeon.
Paul Godard, doctor, father of Jean-Luc Godard.
Blaise Le Fèvre, royal apothecary.
George-Louis Le Sage (1676-1759), physician and philosopher.
John Misaubin, French-born British physician
Lucie Odier (1886-1984), nurse, member of the International Committee of the Red Cross, expert on relief actions for civilians, outspoken opponent of Nazi Germany.
Oskar Panizza (1853-1921), psychiatrist, writer and mental patient.
Ambroise Paré (1509–1590), French surgeon.
Louis Perrier, physician, mineral water company founder.
Samuel Pozzi (1846–1918), doctor.
Paul Reclus (1847–1914), doctor. 
Philibert Sarrasin, physician.
Sir John Baptist Silvester (1714-1789), doctor at the French Hospital, born in the Netherlands to Huguenot refugee parents.
Paul-Louis Simond, medical researcher.
John Thorius, physician, fellow of the College of Physicians of Dublin, son of Raphael Thorius.
Raphael Thorius (died 1625), physician and poet.

Educationalists
Claude Baduel, pedagogue.
Hosea Ballou II (1796–1861), first president of Tufts University
John Bascom (1827–1911), American university president, writer.
Jean Belmain (died after 1557), French scholar, French-language tutor to King Edward VI and Queen Elizabeth I.
Anthony Benezet (1713–1784), American Quaker educator and abolitionist, from Saint-Quentin.
Pierre Berthoud, French chairman, Faculté Jean Calvin, Aix-en-Provence.
Jacques Bongars (1554–1612), scholar.
James Bowdoin III (1752–1811), founder of Bowdoin College
Ferdinand Buisson (1841–1932), educator, academic, pacifist, Nobel Peace Prize winner. 
Isaac Casaubon, scholar.
Méric Casaubon (1599-1671), scholar, translator, Anglican minister, son of Isaac Casaubon.
Daniel de Superville (1696–1773), founder of the University of Erlangen.
Marie de Védrines, French former academic secretary, Faculté Jean Calvin, Aix-en-Provence.
Aline Dieleman, French former academic librarian, Faculté Jean Calvin, Aix-en-Provence.
France Dressen-Durrleman (1916-1997), founder of the Collège-Lycée Bernard Palissy in 1942, son of Freddy Durrleman.
Esther Duflo (1972-), French economist, winner of the Nobel Prize for Economics.
Pascal Geffroy, French former chairman, Faculté Jean Calvin, Aix-en-Provence.
Charles Gide (1847-1932), French economist and pacifist. 
François Goguel (1909-1999), political scientist.
Yannick Imbert (1978-), French professor of apologetics, Faculté Jean Calvin, Aix-en-Provence.
Robert Jospin (1899-1990), teacher,  father of Lionel Jospin.
Félix Pécaut (1828–1898),  educationalist and pacifist.
Arthur Cecil Pigou, English economist.
Jules Prudhommeaux, teacher, pacifist, co-founder of Peace Through Law.
Jean Rou (1638–1711),   educationalist, scholar and civil servant.
Évelyne Sullerot (1924-2017), sociologist.

Entrepreneurs and businesspeople
Jean André (1734–1794), banker.
Jean Barbot (1655-1712), slave trader, writer about West Africa.
Karl Benz (1844–1929), German inventor. 
Charles Bosanquet, merchant.
David Bosanquet, merchant.
Pierre Boué (1677–1745), merchant and shipyard owner, Germany.
Warren Buffett (1930–), investor, wealthiest person in the world in 1995 and 2008, descendant of Mareen Duvall.
Delillers Carbonnel (born 1654), banker, son of Guillaume  Carbonnel.
Guillaume Carbonnel,  merchant, from Caen.
Joseph Cartony, china merchant.
John Castaing, stockbroker.
Edward Cazalet (1827-1833), merchant and industrialist, promoter of Zionism.
Philip Cazenove, stockbroker, philanthropist (supported Jewish domestic charities - Calvinists, religious non-Conformists felt a special affiliation for them as fellow-marginalised people).
Peter Chamberlan, merchant, from Rouen.
Samuel Courtauld (industrialist) (1793–1881), American-born British industrialist
Samuel Courtauld (art collector), grandnephew of the industrialist, businessman, art collector
Frederic de Coninck (1740–1811), entrepreneur.
Robert Champion de Crespigny (1950–), Australian businessman (Normandy Mining).
Joseph Costance, statue merchant.
Jean De Dietrich (1719-1795), factory owner, entrepreneur, founder of De Dietrich.
Gustaf de Laval, Swedish engineer, inventor.
Benjamin Delessert (1773–1847), entrepreneur, banker.
Etienne Delessert (1735–1816), banker. 
François-Marie Delessert (1780-1868), banker and politician, son of Étienne Delessert. 
Charles Delevingne (1949-), English property developer, father of Cara and Poppy Delevingne, French Huguenot ancestry.
Malcolm Delevingne (1868-1950), English civil servant.
Jean de Neuflize (1850–1928), banker.
Sebastien de Neufville (1545–1609), merchant in Germany.
James-Alexandre de Pourtalès (1776–1855) banker. 
Louis de Seynes (1868-1941), agricultural engineer and industrialist, member of Association Sully, a former Protestant and royalist movement.
Jacques De Tessier, merchant, ancestor of the Barons De Tessier.
E. I. du Pont, founder of the duPont Company (US)
Frédéric Engel-Dollfus (1818–1883), industrialist and philanthropist.
Andrew Faneuil, merchant and real estate agent.
Peter Faneuil (1700–1743), merchant, slave trader and philanthropist.
John Francis Fauquier (1677-1740), banker, from Clairac.
Claude Fonnereau (1677-1740), banker, from La Rochelle.
James Gaultier, banker, from  Angoulême.
Jacob Gontard (1702-1766), banker.
Pierre-François Pascal Guerlain, perfumer, founder of Guerlain.
Jérôme Hatt, founder of Kronenbourg Brewery.
Thierry Hermès (1801-1878), founder of Hermès fashion chain. 
Hans-Konrad Hottinger (1764–1841), banker.
Jean-Philippe Hottinguer, associate-manager of the Hottinguer Bank.
John Houblon (1632–1712), first governor of the Bank of England.
Howard Hughes, American inventor, industrialist, billionaire 
Jean Henri Huguetan, entrepreneur.
Éric Jaulmes, technical director of Motobécane. The company's co-founder, Charles Benoit, was also a Protestant and was the son of a pastor.
Leonard Jerome, American financier, grandfather of Winston Churchill
Charles Kestner, chemical plant owner, father of Eugénie Kestner.
André Koechlin, founder of Alstom.
Robert Ladbroke (1713-1773), merchant banker, politician.
George Larpent (1786-1855), British businessman.
David Digues LaTouche, founded Irish bank, from Blois.
Benjamin Henry Latrobe, II, American engineer.
Henry Laurens, American merchant, delegate to the Continental Congress.
Peter Le Heup (1699-1777), banker.
John Lequesne, banker, from Rouen.
Arnaud Leenhardt, vice-president of the CNPF, head of the Federation of Metallurgical and Mining Industries.
François Lévesque (1732–1787), Canadian merchant, justice of the peace and politician, of the Lévesque family of weavers originally from Bolbec, Normandy.
Peter Abraham Luard, Hamburg merchant, family originally from Caen.
Charles Mallet (1815–1902), banker.
Isaac Mallet (1684–1779), banker.
Gabriel Manigault (1704-1781), American merchant.
Jean Martell (1694–1753), cognac manufacturer.
Jerome Monod, chairman of Lyonnaise des Eaux.
Julien Monod, banker, grandfather of Jean-Luc Godard.
Thomas Papillon (1623-1702), merchant, investor in the East India Company,  master of the Mercers’ Company.
Pierre Peschier (1739-1812), banker.
Armand Peugeot (1849–1914), car manufacturer (French Lutheran). 
Eric Peugeot, head of the European Automotive Directorate (French Lutheran).
Jean-Pierre Peugeot (1768–1852), steel manufacturer (French Lutheran).
Jean-Pierre Peugeot (1896-1966), car company director, founder of FC Sochaux-Montbéliard as a football club for his factory's employees, philanthropist (French Lutheran).
Thierry Peugeot (1957-), head of Peugeot supervisory board (French Lutheran).
John Pintard, American merchant, philanthropist
Thomas Ravenel, American real estate developer, politician, reality TV star
Jean Rémy-Martin, cognac manufacturer.
John D. Rockefeller (1839-1937), American capitalist, descended from the Rochefeuille or Rocquefeuille family.
Pieter Francois Roux, South African Renewable energy
Marvin Travis Runyon, American business executive
Jean-Baptiste Say (1767–1832), French economist, businessman.
Louis Say (1774-1840), founder of Béghin-Say, brother of the economist, Jean-Baptiste Say.
Igor Schlumberger, technology entrepreneur, co-founder of  LeGuide.com and PrestaShop.
Laetitia Schlumberger, lingerie company founder (Dement).
Maurice Schlumberger (1886–1977) banker.
Marie Schlumberger,  leather goods entrepreneur (A Summer in Autumn).
Jean-Daniel Schutzenberger (1737-1798), founder of Schutzenberger Brewery (French Lutheran).
Louis Schweitzer (1942-), head of Renault.
Antoine Seydoux, technology entrepreneur, founder of D2AIR2 and Chronovideo.
Bruno Seydoux, former leader of the GMF.
Capucine Seydoux, children's fashion entrepreneur (Chouchou and Manchou).
Henri Seydoux, founder of Parrot.
Cornelius Carl Souchay (1768-1838), German-British businessman and stockbroker, philanthropist (supporter of Jewish domestic charities), art patron, son of the preacher in the Frankfurt French Reformed Church, Jean-Daniel Souchay de la Duboissière (1736-1811), great-grandfather of Max Weber.
Serge Tchuruk (1937-), head of Alcatel.
Isaac Tillard (died 1726), property investor, justice of the peace, land tax commissioner.
Guillaume Trie, merchant.
Bertrand Vernes, banker.
Jean-Marc Vernes, financier.
Sam Walton (1918–1992), founder of Walmart and Sam's Club, descendant of Chretien DuBois.
Bernard Westercamp, vice-president of Accor.
Obadiah Williams, Irish merchant.

Farmers
Sir Richard Boyer (1891–1961), Australian pastoralist and chairman of the ABC.
Olivier de Serres (1539–1619), horticulturalist, peaceworker and ecologist. 
Francois du Toit, South African farmer.
Gabriël du Toit, South African farmer.
Pierre Joubert (1664-1732), South African viticulturalist.
Lewis Majendie (1756–1833), English agriculturalist.

Geographers
Élie Reclus (1827–1904), ethnographer and anarchist, son of Pastor Jacques Reclus.
Élisée Reclus (1830–1905), geographer and anarchist, son of Pastor Jacques Reclus.
Onésime Reclus (1837–1916), geographer, son of Pastor Jacques Reclus. 
Armand Reclus (1843–1927), geographer and explorer, son of Pastor Jacques Reclus.
John Rocque (1705-1762), cartographer, specialised in mapping of gardens, created plans of British towns and pioneering road guides for travellers.
Mary Ann Rocque (1725-1770), cartographer, wife of John Rocque, daughter of the Scalé family.

Historians
Ernest-Charles Babut (1875-1916), historian specialising in early Christianity, son of Pastor Charles-Édouard Babut.
Jean Baubérot (1941-), historian.
Elie Benoist (1640-1728), historian of the Edict of Nantes, pastor.
Eugène Bersier (1831-1889),  vice-president of the Société d'Histoire du Protestantisme Français, pastor, church unifier, church founder, school founder.
Maximilien de Béthune, duc de Sully (1560–1641), memoirist. Key work: Économies royales. 
Patrick Cabanel (1961-), historian.
Marianne Carbonnier-Burkard (1949-), historian, vice-president of the Society for the History of French Protestantism and a member of the National Ethics Advisory Committee for Life and Health Sciences.
Bernard Cottret (1951–2020), historian.
Jean Norton Cru (1879-1949), historian of the First World War, anti-war activist, literature teacher, pastor's son. Key work: Témoins.
Jean-Henri Merle d'Aubigné (1794-1872), historian and pastor, descendant of Agrippa d'Aubigné. Key work: Discourse on the History of Christianity. 
François de la Noue (1531–1591), memoirist.
Lancelot Voisin de La Popelinière (1541–1608), historian.
Jean de Mergey, memoirist, survivor of the Saint Bartholomew's Day Massacre, survivor of the Battle of Dreux. Key work: Memoires.
Paul de Rapin (1661-1725), historian. Key work: History of England.
Gédéon Tallemant des Réaux (1619–1690), memoirist.
Jean de Serres (1540–1598), historian, political advisor and pastor.
G.E.M. de Ste. Croix (1910–2000), British Marxist historian and atheist, paternal lineage was Huguenot.
Charlotte Duplessis-Mornay (1550–1606), memoirist, wife of Philippe de Mornay. Key work: Memories of Philippe de Mornay
André Encrevé (1942-), historian.
Jean Pierre Erman (1735–1814), historian and pastor in the French Church of Berlin.
James Fontaine, memoirist. Key work:  Memoirs of a Huguenot Family.
François Guizot (1787–1874), French historian, statesman. Key work: History of France. 
Auguste Himly (1823–1906), French historian and geographer.
Jules Michelet (1798-1874), historian. 
Jean Migault, memoirist from Poitou. Key work:  Jean Migault: Or, the Trials of a French Protestant Family, During the Period of the Revocation of the Edict of Nantes.
Gabriel Monod (1844–1912), historian, Dreyfus supporter.
Xavier Peugeot, head of Peugeot Museum (French Lutheran).
Napoléon Peyrat (1809–1881), pastor and historian.
E. Constantin Privat (1900–1976), president of the German Huguenot Society from 1950 to 1971.
Frank Puaux (1844–1922), historian, pastor and museum founder.
Charles Read (1819–1898), historian.
Pierre Christian Frédéric Reclam (1741–1789), historian and pastor in the French Church of Berlin.
Jean-Pierre Richardot (1929-2021), historian and journalist.
Joseph Justus Scaliger (1540–1609), historian, creationist and chronologer. Key work: Manilius. 
Charles Seignobos (1854–1942), historian. 
Gédéon Tallemant des Réaux (1619-1690), historian. Key work: Historiettes.
Melesina Trench (1768-1827), Irish diarist, granddaughter of Bishop Richard Chenevix, descended from the Chenevix family of Metz, Lorraine.

Jewellers, clockmakers and craftsmen
Charles Angler, wood carver.
Peter Archambo, London goldsmith.
William Asprey, royal jeweller.
François Asselin, clockmaker.
Philip Audinet (1766-1837), engraver.
James Barbar, gunsmith, son of Lewis (Louis) Barbar.
Lewis Barbar, gunsmith, official armourer to Kings George I and George II.
Isaac Basire (1704-1768), engraver.
Paul Bertrand, craftsman.
Thomas Bevault, goldsmith.
Georges Bidet, gunsmith.
Thomas Bonnell, upholsterer.
Anthony Boureau, gunsmith in America.
Nicholas Briot (1579-1646), engraver.
Matthew Burcheil, cutler
Charles Cabrier, clockmaker.
Jean Carre, glassmaker.
Jean Cavalier, engraver.
Jean Chardin (later Sir John Chardin) (1643–1713), French jeweller, traveller. 
Jean Chartier, London goldsmith.
Honor Chassereau, fan-maker.
Jean Baptiste Claude Chatelain (1710-1771), engraver.
Paul Daniel Chenevix, ivory carver.
David Columbell, gunsmith, probably of Huguenot descent.
Augustin Courtauld, London goldsmith.
Louisa Courtauld (1729-1807), silversmith.
Paul Crespin, goldsmith.
Louis Cuny, London goldsmith.
Peter Debaufre, watchmaker.
Simon de Charmes, clockmaker.
Isaac de la Chaumette, gunsmith.
Paul de Lamerie (1688-1751), London silversmith, the King's Silversmith.
Henry Delany, gunsmith.
John Dollond (1706-1761), optical instruments manufacturer, founded business in 1750 that was to become Dollond and Aitchison.
James Dubourg, wood carver.
Claudius Andre Duchesne, clockmaker.
Isaac Du Four, wood carver.
Peter Dutens, craftsman.
Gustav Fabergé (1814-1894), Russian jeweller, descended from the Favri family of Picardy.
Peter Carl Fabergé (1846-1920), Russian jeweller, descended from the Favri family of Picardy.
Jacques Fenoulhet, clockmaker.
Paul Fourdrinier (1698–1758), engraver.
Pierre Garnault, goldsmith.
Jacques Gorgo, gunsmith.
Jacob Gosset, wood carver.
Charles Gouyn (died 1785), jeweller.
Simon Gribelin (1661–1733), silver engraver.
David Grignion, goldsmith, watch repairer, from Poitou.
Pierre Harache, goldsmith.
Jean Francois Hobler (1727-1794), watch and clockmaker.
Nicholas Jourdain, clockmaker, governor of the Spitalfields workhouse, director of the French Hospital, from Dieppe.
Isaac Lacam, craftsman.
Jacques Lamarre, gunsmith.
George Lambert, goldsmith.
Francis Lapierre, upholsterer.
Robert Le Blond, watchmaker.
David Le Marchand, ivory carver.
Auguste L'Épée (1798-1875), clockmaker and manufacturer of musical boxes.
Augustin Le Sage, silversmith in Canada.
John Hugh Le Sage, London goldsmith, who frequently worked for the British Royal Family and was official goldsmith to King  George II.
John Le Sage (1685-1706), wood craftsman.
John Le Sage, silversmith, Huguenot from Alençon.
David Lestourgeon, watchmaker
Daniel Myron LeFever (1835-1906), American gunsmith.
Matthew Liart, engraver.
Isaac Liger, silversmith.
Pierre Lombart, engraver.
Peter Lormier, watchmaker.
Samuel Marc,  locksmith.
Jacob Margas, London goldsmith.
Nicholas Massy (died 1698), clockmaker, from Blois.
Louis Mettayer, silversmith, son of pastor of La Patente Church in Spitalfields, family from near La Rochelle.
Pierre Monlong, gunsmith.
Pierre Oliver, goldsmith.
Simon Pantin, London goldsmith.
Benjamin Parran, cabinet-maker.
Jean Pelletier, carver and gilder.
Paul Petit, wood carver.
Bernard Picart (1673-1733), engraver.
Auguste Pilleau, goldsmith, father of Pezé Pilleau.
Pezé Pilleau, London goldsmith.
Andrew Planche (1727-1805), porcelain maker.
Pierre Platel, London goldsmith.
Jean Pons, London goldsmith.
Henri de Portal (1690-1747), paper maker.
Peter Rieusset, joiner.
James Riorteau, wood carver.
Phillip Rollos, London goldsmith.
Phillip Rollos II, London goldsmith.
Isaac Russel, cabinet-maker.
John Simon (1675-1751), portrait engraver.
Esay Souchay (1723–1791), goldsmith.
Nicholas Sprimont, porcelain manufacturer.
Anne Tanqueray (1691-1733), goldsmith and silversmith, daughter of David Willaume.
Charles Lewis Tiffany (1812-1902), American jeweller, descended from Jacques Tiphaine, whose family came from Sedan in Champagne.
Jean Tijou, ironworker.
James Valoué, watchmaker, inventor of a type of piledriver, freemason.
David Willaume (1658-), goldsmith.

Journalists
Reginald Bosanquet (1932–1984), English newsreader.
Abel Boyer (1667–1729), journalist. 
Tom Brokaw (born 1940), American television journalist, author.
Edmond-Henri Crisinel (1897–1948), journalist and writer.
Frank Deford (1938–2017), American sports journalist.
Max du Preez, South African journalist and author.
Raymond Durgnat (1932-2002), English film critic, opponent of structuralism and its associated far-left politics, advocate of frequently-derided film-maker Michael Powell, opponent of left wing intellectuals, supporter of working-class culture, descended from French Huguenot refugees who fled to Switzerland.
Sean Else, South African writer, filmmaker
Orla Guerin (1966-), Irish war correspondent.
Gideon Joubert (1923–2010), South African science journalist and Intelligent Design proponent.
Rian Malan (1954–), South African journalist, descended from Jacques Malan of Provence.
Matthieu Maty (1718–1776), journalist, founded Journal Brittanique which helped to familiarize French readers with English literature, member of the Royal Society, under-librarian of the British Museum, from Dauphiné.
Pierre Motteux (1718-1776), journalist, founder of Gentleman's Journal, from Rouen.
Théophraste Renaudot (1584-1653), considered the first French journalist, founder of the Gazette de France.
Giles Romilly (1916–1967), British journalist, Nazi POW, nephew of Winston Churchill.
John Merry Sage (1837–1926), British journalist
Sacha (Spencer Trace) Teulon, founder of Marmalade Magazine and film-maker.
Peregrine Worsthorne (1923–2020), British journalist.

Lawyers
Charles Ancillon (1659–1715), French jurist, diplomat. 
Richard Béringuier (1854–1916), lawyer  and joint-founder of the German Huguenot Society.
Raoul Biville (1863-1909), jurist, law professor, Christian Socialist colleague of Paul Passy, President of the Society for the Evangelization of Normandy.
Jean Carbonnier (1908–2003), jurist,  father of Marianne Carbonnier-Burkard, converted from Roman Catholicism to Protestantism.
Germain Colladon, jurist.
Léon Colladon, jurist.
Warder Cresson (1798–1860), American writer, first US consul to Jerusalem, convert from Quakerism to Judaism, had Huguenot ancestors.
Gustave Fornier de Clausonne(1797-1873), magistrate, member of the Nîmes Consistory, chairman of the French Bible Society.
Jean-Jacques de Félice, lawyer, human rights activist, Cimade board member.
Laurent de Normandie (1520–1569), lawyer.
John Jay (1745–1829), first Chief Justice of the US Supreme Court, descendant of Mary Van Cortlandt and Pierre Jay, a merchant from Poitou.
Pierre Patrick Kaltenbach, barrister, French Audit Bureau, founded  network of Protestant family associations, member of La Force charity.
John Lekeux, lawyer, Spitalfields.
Peter Manigault (1731-1773), attorney, plantation owner and slave owner, wealthiest man in North America at the time of his death, descended from the Manigault family of La Rochelle.
André Philip (1902-1970), lawyer, Christian socialist.
John Romilly (1802–1874), English judge.
Anton Friedrich Justus Thibaut (1772–1840), German jurist.
John Silvester (1745-1822), lawyer, son of Sir John Baptist Silvester (doctor at the French Hospital).
William Teulon Swan Stallybrass (1883–1948), British Barrister, Principal of Brasenose College, Oxford and Vice-Chancellor of the University of Oxford.
Friedrich Carl von Savigny (1779–1861), German jurist.

Librarians
Élie Bouhéreau (1643-1719), Dublin librarian, from La Rochelle.
Hans de Veille, librarian.
Andrew Ducarel (1713-1785), librarian, antiquarian.
Friedrich Clemens Ebrard (1850–1934), German librarian.
Anton Philipp Reclam (1807–1896), German librarian, publisher and founder of the Universalbibliothek. 
John Verneuil (died 1647), sub-librarian, Oxford.

Linguists, lexicographers and semioticians
Roland Barthes (1915–1980), literary theorist and semiotician, Marxist atheist from a Protestant family.
Ferdinand de Saussure (1857–1913), linguist and semiotician, whose mother was from a wealthy Protestant banking family, and whose father's family consisted of a long line of Huguenot academics who had fled to Geneva to escape persecution. 
Pierre Encrevé (1939-2019), linguist,  brother of André Encrevé, son of a pastor.
Michael Maittaire (1668-1747), linguist.
Paul Passy (1859-1940), linguist, Social Christianity advocate, lived according to 'primitive Christian' ideals, son of the Nobel Peace Prize laureate, Frédéric Passy.
Peter Mark Roget (1779–1869), lexicographer, creator of Roget's Thesaurus, physician. 
Wilhelm von Humboldt (1767-1835), German linguist.

Martyrs and victims of persecution
Arnaud (first name unknown), from the village of Saint Hypolite,  galley slave.
Antoine Astrue, galley slave.
Jane Baille, of Charollois, imprisoned in convent by a Jesuit for refusing to abjure her faith.
Frances Baillet (died 1572), wife of the Queen's goldsmith, martyr (Saint Bartholomew's Day Massacre), some dismembered body parts eaten by dogs, mutilated corpse thrown into a river.
Nicolas Ballon (died 1556), executed for possessing a Bible.
Jacob Bayle, martyr, died in prison.
Beaudisner (first name unknown) (died 1572), nobleman, martyr (Saint Bartholomew's Day Massacre).
Beauvais (first name unknown) (died 1572), nobleman, governor to the King of Navarre, martyr (Saint Bartholomew's Day Massacre).
Peter Bergier (died 1552), merchant, martyr, burnt at the stake.
Berny (first name unknown) (died 1572), nobleman, martyr (Saint Bartholomew's Day Massacre).
Beure (first name unknown) (died 1572), nobleman, martyr (Saint Bartholomew's Day Massacre).
Blosset (first name unknown) (died 1572), nobleman, martyr (Saint Bartholomew's Day Massacre).
Bonnet (first name unknown), pastor, wounded, taken prisoner and publicly mocked in Mâcon, 1562.
Andrew Bosquet, teenage boy sentenced to galley slavery.
Francis Bourry, teenage boy sentenced to galley slavery.
Madeleine Briçonnet (died 1572), martyr (Saint Bartholomew's Day Massacre).
Jean Brion (died 1572), governor of the Marquis of Conti, martyr (Saint Bartholomew's Day Massacre).
Claude Brousson (1647–1698), martyr, pastor and pacifist.
Bugnette (first name unknown) (died 1572), pastor, martyr, (Saint Bartholomew's Day Massacre).
Jean Calas (1698–1762), martyr.

Cauquet (first name unknown) (died 1686), wife of surgeon Samuel Cauquet of Montpellier, martyr, naked and mutilated body exposed in the street, stoned by the public  and repeatedly run over by dragonnades' horses.
Peter Chantguyon (died 1561), martyr (Massacre of Vassy).
Chantguyon (first name unknown) (died 1687), martyr, Vassy, descendant of Peter Chantguyon.
Charpentier (first name unknown) (died 1685), from Roufee in Angoumois, martyr, tortured to death by the Dragonnades. His son, Jean Charpentier, a refugee, became pastor in Canterbury.
Chemet (first name unknown) (died 1687), martyr, Vassy, brother-in-law of Chantguyon.
Paul Chenevix (1606-1686), Dean of the Counsellors of the Parliament of Metz, martyr, executed, body stripped naked and dumped on a dunghill, ancestor of Richard Chenevix and Melesina Trench.
Peter Crousel (died 1686), martyr, dragged to death by horse.
François d'Andelot (1521-1569), imprisoned by Henri II and nearly burnt at the stake, younger brother of Coligny.
Guido de Brès (died 1567), pastor, martyr of Valenciennes, incarcerated in sewage for six weeks before being executed.
Antoine de Clermont d'Amboise Marquis de Rénel (died 1572), martyr (Saint Bartholomew's Day Massacre).
Gaspard II de Coligny (1519–1572), martyr (Saint Bartholomew's Day Massacre), Huguenot leader. 
Colombiers (first name unknown) (died 1572), nobleman, martyr (Saint Bartholomew's Day Massacre).
Cornaton (first name unknown) (died 1572), nobleman, martyr (Saint Bartholomew's Day Massacre).
Charles de Beaumanoir de Lavardin (died 1572), nobleman, martyr (Saint Bartholomew's Day Massacre).
David de Caumont, baron of Montbelon, galley slave.
Francis Nompar de Caumont (died 1572), nobleman, martyr (Saint Bartholomew's Day Massacre).
Antony de Clermont (died 1572), nobleman, martyr (Saint Bartholomew's Day Massacre).
Jean de Ferrières, Vidame de Chartres (1520–1586), French nobleman, martyr who died in prison galley.
Stephen de la Forge (died 1534), executed for possessing a Bible.
Peregrine de La Grange (died 1567), pastor, martyr of Valenciennes.
Pierre de la Place (died 1572), duke, martyr (Saint Bartholomew's Day Massacre).
Francis Delarochefoucauld, escaped from abbey in which he was being held prisoner for forced conversion.
Francis de la Rochefoucault (died 1572), nobleman, martyr (Saint Bartholomew's Day Massacre).
Antony de Maraffin Lord of Guerchy (died 1572), martyr (Saint Bartholomew's Day Massacre).
Louis de Marolles, counsellor of the king, galley slave, memoirist. Key work: Histoire des souffrances du bien-heureux martyr Mr. Louis de Marolles.
Tristan de Moneins (died 1572), martyr (Saint Bartholomew's Day Massacre).
Samuel De Péchels, victim of persecution by dragonnades, refugee.
Charles de Quellenec (1548–1572), baron of Pont-l'Abbé, first husband of Catherine de Parthenay, martyr (Saint Bartholomew's Day Massacre).
Des Gorris (first name unknown) (died 1572), pastor, martyr (Saint Bartholomew's Day Massacre).
Des Pruneaux (first name unknown) (died 1572), martyr (Saint Bartholomew's Day Massacre).
Charles de Téligny (1535–1572), French diplomat, martyr (Saint Bartholomew's Day Massacre), first husband of Louise de Coligny.
Guy de Vicose Baron de La Court, heavily persecuted by the dragonnades, later a director and, eventually, the Governor, of the London French Hospital.
Sebastian de Villettes lord of Montledier, country gentleman, heavily persecuted during the Revocation.
N. Dives (first name unknown) (died 1572), pastor, martyr, killed in Lyons (in the wake of the Saint Bartholomew's Day Massacre).
Anne du Bourg (1530–1559), martyr, magistrate, counsellor of France.
Jean du Bourg, draper, publicly mocked, had his hand cut off and martyred for posting anti-mass placards.
Du Crosse (first name unknown) (died 1687), martyr, Marseilles.
Robert d'Ully, viscount de Novion (1606-1686), martyr, Picardy, executed and body thrown into a dog's kennel by Roman Catholic  monks.
Marie Durand (1711–1776), from Bouchet du Pransles in Vivarais, prisoner of conscience (Tower of Constance). Key work:  Lettres de Marie Durand (1711-1776): Prisonnière à la Tour de Constance de 1730 à 1768. 
Pierre Durand (1700–1732) martyr, pastor.
Francourt (first name unknown) (died 1572), nobleman, martyr (Saint Bartholomew's Day Massacre).
Blanche Gamond (1664-circa 1700), from Saint-Paul-Trois-Chateux in  Dauphiné, prisoner of conscience in Grenoble and Valences  1686–87, torture victim and memoirist. Key work: Blanche Gamond, a Heroine of the Faith (English-language title of her memoir).
Gastine (last name unknown) (died 1572), widow and mother of two young children, martyr (Saint Bartholomew's Day Massacre).
Giscart (died 1562), first name unknown, pastor, martyred at Castelnaudary.
Jean Goujon (1510–1572), sculptor, martyr (Saint Bartholomew's Day Massacre).
Hamelin (first name unknown) (died 1546), executed for possessing a Bible.
Philibert Hamelin (died 1557), executed for being a clandestine pastor.
Isaac Homel (1612-1683), pastor of Soyon, martyr publicly executed on the wheel on the order of the Jesuits.
John Huber, galley slave.
Keny (first name unknown) (died 1572), martyr (Saint Bartholomew's Day Massacre).
Robert a Knacker (died 1686), pauper of Metz, martyr, executed, body stripped naked and dumped on a dunghill.
Baudon la Cassaigne, civic leader in Nîmes, jailed.
Jacques Langlois (died 1572), pastor, martyr, killed in Lyons (in the wake of the Saint Bartholomew's Day Massacre).
La Renaudie (died 1560), pseudonym for aristocrat, conspirator, martyr (Amboise Conspiracy).
Laugoiran (first name unknown) (died 1572), nobleman, martyr (Saint Bartholomew's Day Massacre).
Louis Le Coq (died 1572), pastor, martyr, killed in Rouen (in the wake of the Saint Bartholomew's Day Massacre).
Magdalen Lefebvre, Norman farmer's daughter, child refugee smuggled out of France alone, from near Avranches, one of Magdalen's descendants was a friend of Eizabeth Gaskell, who documented her story.
Isaac Le Fevre, Advocate of Parliament, martyr, died on a slave galley.
Le More (first name unknown) (died 1572), pastor, martyr (Saint Bartholomew's Day Massacre).
Barthélemi Milon, paraplegic, martyred for possessing anti-mass placard.
Monneins (first name unknown) (died 1572), nobleman, martyr (Saint Bartholomew's Day Massacre).
Claude Monier (died 1551), pastor, martyr.
Matthew Morel, teenage boy sentenced to galley slavery.
Antoine Morlier, galley slave.
Pierre Loiseleur dit de Villiers (died 1572), pastor, martyr, killed in Rouen (in the wake of the Saint Bartholomew's Day Massacre).
Marcil (first name unknown), pastor, wounded or killed Poitiers, 1562.
Jean Marteilhe (1684–1777), from Bergerac, prisoner of conscience (galley slave) and memoirist. Key work: The Huguenot Galley-Slave: Being the Autobiography of a French Protestant Condemned to the Galleys for the Sake of His Religion.
Gabriel Maturin, left crippled by twenty-six years' confinement in the Bastille, ancestor of clergyman and author, Charles Maturin.
Samuel Mettayer, pastor, victim of persecution.
Leonard Morel, pastor, wounded and taken prisoner in the Vassy Massacre, 1561.
Nadal (first name unknown), of the village of de la Salle, condemned to galley slavery.
Spire Niquet (died 1572), bookseller, martyr (Saint Bartholomew's Day Massacre).
Pardaillan (first name unknown) (died 1572), nobleman, martyr (Saint Bartholomew's Day Massacre).
Paulin (first name unknown) (died 1572), nobleman, martyr (Saint Bartholomew's Day Massacre).
Oudin Petit (died 1572), martyr (Saint Bartholomew's Day Massacre).
Piles (first name unknown) (died 1572), nobleman, martyr (Saint Bartholomew's Day Massacre).
Jacques Pineton de Chambrun (1635-1689), pastor held captive and ill-treated by the dragonnades who briefly abjured, memoirs. Key work: Les Larmes.
Pluviant (first name unknown) (died 1572), nobleman, martyr (Saint Bartholomew's Day Massacre).
Quercy (first name unknown) (died 1572), nobleman, martyr (Saint Bartholomew's Day Massacre).
Petrus Ramus (1515–1572), martyr (Saint Bartholomew's Day Massacre), philosopher. 
Catherine Ravental (died 1687), martyr, a Huguenot woman who was in labour when she was murdered by dragonnade soldiers, who then mutilated her other two children.
Regniers (first name unknown) (died 1572), nobleman, martyr (Saint Bartholomew's Day Massacre).
Fulcran Rey (died 1686), theology student, pastor, martyr, of Nîmes, executed.
Jean Ribault (1520–1565), early colonizer of America, he and other Huguenot colonists were massacred by the Spanish for their faith. 
Richer (first name unknown), pastor, wounded or killed Poitiers, 1562.
Saint-Romain (first name unknown) (died 1572), nobleman, martyr (Saint Bartholomew's Day Massacre).
Pierre-Paul Sirven (1709–1777), victim of persecution.
Soubise (first name unknown) (died 1572), martyr (Saint Bartholomew's Day Massacre).
Martin Tachard (died 1567), pastor, martyr, led in mockery through streets of Foix and executed there.
Taverny (first name unknown) (died 1572), martyr (Saint Bartholomew's Day Massacre).
Teiffier (first name unknown) (died 1687), martyr, of Durfort near Nîmes, executed for attending a Protestant church service.
François Vivent (died 1692), Camisard lay preacher, martyr, killed by Government soldiers in a gun battle.

Military

Fidel Abric, Camisard.
John André (1751–1780), British officer, spy.
Francis Beaufort (1774–1857), hydrographer of the British Admiralty
Salomon Blosset de Loche (1648–1721), French general.
John Blossett, British soldier, led British expedition to aid Simon Bolivar in the wars of independence against Spain
Moïse Bonnett, Camisard.
David Bougarde dit La Veille, Camisard.
Jean Pierre Buis, Camisard leader.
Marquis Calmes, general, veteran of the American Revolution and the War of 1812.
Henri Castanet (1674-1705), Camisard leader.
Jan Celliers (1861-1931), Anglo-Boer War general
Joshua Lawrence Chamberlain, Union general in the US Civil War, governor of the state of Maine.
Harry Chauvel (1865–1945), Australian military commander, liberator of Jerusalem (the Battle of Beersheba).
Pierre Claris, Camisard.
Frederick Cockayne Elton, Crimean War recipient of the Victoria Cross
Buffalo Bill Cody (1846-1917), American soldier, hunter and showman.
Jacques Couderc dit La Fleurette, Camisard.
Salomon Couderc, Camisard leader.
Piet Cronje, leader of the Transvaal Republic's military forces during the First and Second Anglo-Boer Wars.
François de Beauvais, Seigneur de Briquemault, French soldier
Henri I de Bourbon, prince de Condé (1552–1588), French general, son of Louis de Condé. 
Louis I de Bourbon, prince de Condé (1530–1569), French general, brother-in-law of Jeanne d'Albret (Queen of Navarre). 
Alfred Gardyne de Chastelain, British Army lieutenant colonel, member of the Special Operations Executive
John de Chastelain, Canadian diplomat, general and chief of Defence Staff of the Canadian Forces
Hector Francois Chataigner de Cramahé, French soldier, assisted William of Orange in the taking of the British throne
Peter de la Billière, British military commander
François de la Noue (1531–1591), French soldier, called Bras-de-Fer (Iron Arm).
Henri de La Tour d'Auvergne, Duke of Bouillon (1555–1623), French soldier, prince of Sedan, Marshal of France.
Ulrich de Maizière (1912–2006), German general, descended from a noble family of French Huguenot origin, originally from Maizières-lès-Metz in Lorraine.
Henri de Massue, Earl of Galway (1648-1720), soldier.
Philippe Aristide Denfert-Rochereau (1823-1878), military officer, liberal Protestant.
John Watts de Peyster, American Brevet Major General in the American Civil War 
Jean de Poltrot (1537–1563), shot the Duke of Guise in  arguably history's earliest firearm assassination.
Henri, duc de Rohan (1579–1638), French soldier, son of Catherine de Parthenay.
Christiaan du Toit, South African military commander
Charles FitzRoy, British Army officer
Henry Gage, 3rd Viscount Gage, major general in the British Army
Adolf Galland, German Luftwaffe general, World War II fighter ace
Johannes Petrus Gous (General), Commissioner of the South African Police from 1968 to 1971.
Henri Guisan, Commander-in-Chief of the Swiss Army during World War II
Peter Horry, American Revolutionary War general
Benjamin Huger, American Civil War general (Confederate)
Petrus Jacobus Joubert, Boer commandant-general of the South African Republic from 1880 to 1900
Gédéo Laporte, Camisard leader.
Pierre Laporte (nicknamed Rolland) (1680-1704), Camisard leader.
Jean L'Archevêque, French explorer, soldier, merchant-trader
John Laurens, American Revolutionary War hero
Francois Joseph LeFevre Duke of Dantzic (1755- 1820), one of Napoleon's Marshals, from Alsace.
Curtis LeMay(1906–1990) American Air Force General and Air Force Chief of Staff
Anton Wilhelm von L'Estocq, Prussian general
John Ligonier, 1st Earl Ligonier Commander-in-Chief of the British Army
Adolph Malan, South African World War II fighter pilot ace
Magnus Malan, former South African Minister of Defence, Chief of the South African Defence Force, Chief of the South African Army
Arthur Middleton Manigault, American Civil War general (Confederate)
Francis Marion, American Revolutionary War guerrilla fighter.
Hans-Joachim Marseille (1919-1942), German Luftwaffe ace, penitent for the killings he committed.
Peter Mawney, colonel, Rhode Island militia
Abraham Mazel, Camisard leader.
Isaac de Monceau, Sieur De La Melonière, Lieutenant-Colonel of the Regiment of Anjou and brigadier of King William's Huguenot regiment in the Battle of the Boyne, originally from Beaume (Belna), in the Duchy of Burgundy, with an estate in Dauphiny.
Charles Manigault Morris, American Navy officer (Confederate)
Lewis Nicola, American Revolutionary War General (Union)
Jean Nicolas dit Joany, Camisard leader.
Pierre Nouvel, Camisard.
George S Patton, Jr, US WWII Army general
Paul Pechell (1724 - 1800), Irish  military commander,  grandson of Samuel De Péchels.
J. Johnston Pettigrew, American Civil War general (Confederate)
George Pickett, American Civil War general (Confederate)
Charles Portal, British Chief of the Air Staff 1940–1945 Combined Chiefs of Staff 1942–1945
Laurant Ravanel, Camisard leader.
Paul Revere (1735–1818), American silversmith, famous for "Paul Revere's Ride" at the outbreak of the American War of Independence, descended from the Rivoire family from Riocaud, in the Gironde valley, near Bordeaux.
Barry St. Leger, British officer
François Salles dit Salette, Camisard leader.
Henri Salmide (real name Heinz Stahlschmidt) (1919-2010), German military officer who became hero by refusing to obey orders to destroy Bordeaux.
Frederick Schomberg, 1st Duke of Schomberg (1615–1690), commander of King William III's army, Battle of the Boyne. 
Pierre Séguier dit Esprit Séguier (1650-1702), Camisard leader.
Alan Shepard (1923–1998),  astronaut, first American in space, descendant of Philippe de La Noye.
Charles C. Tew, colonel Confederate States Army
Ernst Udet (1896-1941), German First World War Ace, Luftwaffe Colonel-General in World War Two, committed suicide.
John Vereker, 6th Viscount Gort, Chief of the Imperial General Staff of the British Army, commander of the British Expeditionary Force (World War II), descendant of the North American Delancey family 
Constand Viljoen (1933–2020), leader of the South African Freedom Front, SADF general
John Bordenave Villepigue (1830–1862), American Civil War general (Confederate)
John C. Villepigue (1896–1943), Medal of Honor winner
Lothar von Arnauld de la Perière (1886–1941), highest scoring German U-boat commander of World War I
Bruno von François (1818–1870), Prussian general, father of Hermann and Curt.
Curt von François (1852–1931), German soldier, geographer and administrator in German South-West Africa (now Namibia).
Hermann von François (1856–1933), German World War I general, victor of the Battle of Tannenberg.

Missionaries
Mac All (1821-1893), founder, Mission for Paris Workers.
Thomas Arbousset, missionary in Orange Free State, member of the Paris Evangelical Missionary Society.
Thomas Barclay (1849–1935), Scottish missionary.
Alfred Casalis (1862 -1950), missionary pastor.
Annette Casalis (1908-1988). missionary doctor, sister of Georges Casalis.
Eugène Casalis, missionary and director of the Paris Evangelical Missions Society.
Georges Casalis, missionary doctor.
Jean-Eugène Casalis (1812-1891), missionary.
François Daumas, missionary in Orange Free State, member of the Paris Evangelical Missionary Society.
Constant Gosselin, lay missionary.
Clement Le Cossec (1921-2001), founder of the Evangelical Gypsy Mission.
Maurice Leenhardt (1878-1954),  missionary, pastor and ethnologist specialising in the Kanak people of New Caledonia.
Henri Pyt (1796-1835), missionary who helped rebuild church in France after century of persecution.
Eugène Réveillaud (1851-1935), founder,  Parisian Committee of Domestic Mission.
Napoléon Roussel (1805-1878), church planter in Charente.
Pierre Stouppe (1690–1760), Huguenot pastor then low church/evangelical Anglican minister, missionary to African-American slaves.

Musicians
Cecilia Maria Barthélemon (1767-1859), opera singer and composer, daughter of François-Hippolyte Barthélémon.
François Hippolyte Barthélémon (1741-1808), composer of operas, masques, symphonies, chamber music and hymns (Awake my soul, and with the sun, Mighty God While Angels Bless Thee), from Bordeaux.
Loys Bourgeois (1510–1559), Psalm music composer (the "Old 100th").
Edmond Louis Budry (1854–1932), hymnwriter ("Thine Be the Glory"). 
Rosemary Clooney (1928-2002), American jazz and Hollywood musicals singer and actress, descended from the Koch family of Alsace-Lorraine.
Alice Cooper (real name Vincent Damon Furnier) (1948-), American heavy metal singer and born-again Christian.
Pierre Davantès (1525–1561), composer and scholar.
Paschal de l'Estocart (1538-1587), Psalm music composer.
Jacques Ducros, tenor with Ensemble Huguenot.
Ampie du Preez (1982-), South African singer-songwriter.
Brian Eno (1948–), English music producer, ambient musician, atheist, descended from the Hennot family of Mons, Flanders.
Odile Faniard, mezzo-soprano with Ensemble Huguenot.
George Fourie, South African opera singer.
Johnny Fourie, South African jazz guitarist.
Guillaume Franc (1505–1571), Psalm music composer.
Eric Galia, pastor, jazz musician (Esprit-Swing Trio).
Judy Garland (1922-1969), American jazz and Hollywood musicals singer and actress, French Huguenot ancestry on her father's side. 
Severine Genevaz, soprano with Ensemble Huguenot.
Kendji Girac, musician.
Claude Goudimel (1520–1572), composer of musical settings for the Psalms (Genevan Psalter), martyr (Saint Bartholomew's Day Massacre). 
Nikolaus Harnoncourt (1939–2016), Austrian conductor.
Christian Ignatius Latrobe (1758–1836), British clergyman, composer and musician, whose ancestors came from Languedoc.
André Isoir (1935–2016), classical organist.
Philibert Jam-de-Fer, musician.
Nicholas Lanier (1588–1666), Master of the King's Musick. 
Simon Le Bon (1958-), English musician and frontman of pop-rock band Duran Duran. 
Claudin Le Jeune (1530-1600), composer and music publisher of the Genevan Psalter, from Valenciennes. 
Bill Le Sage (1927–2001), British jazz musician, descendant of a Valenciennes journeyman silkweaver, Jacques Le Sage, and his son, also a journeyman silkweaver, Pierre Le Sage (born Leiden, died Spitalfields, married into the Le Grand family of Saint-Quentin. Later Le Sage descendants in Spitalfields married with the Levesques, weavers originally from Bolbec, and with the Le Maréchals of Caen. One branch of the Le Sage family later emigrated to Australia.)
Jean-Bernard Logier (1777-1846), composer who developed a system of musical notation.
Lorna Luft (1952–), American jazz and Hollywood musicals singer and actress, daughter of Judy Garland.
César Malan (1787–1864), hymnwriter ("Everyday I Will Bless You", "It Is Not Death to Die", "O Holy Spirit Blessed Comforter", "What Are the Pleasures of the World?" and "My Saviour's Praises I Will Sing"), originator of the modern hymn movement in the French Reformed Church, pastor and novelist. 
Samuel Mareschal (1554-), organist and music publisher of the Genevan Psalter.
Clément Marot (1496–1544), poet who versified the Psalms into French (Genevan Psalter). 
Liza Minnelli (1946–), American jazz and Hollywood musicals singer and actress, daughter of Judy Garland.
Bertrand Monbaylet, bass-baritone with Ensemble Huguenot.
Jacques-Louis Monod (1927-2020), pianist, composer and teacher.
Bénédict Pictet, composer of hymns and Christmas carols.
Peter Prelleur (1705–1741), composer, organist and music teacher.
Jean-Jacques Quesnot de La Chênée, librettist, theatre manager, staged Lully operas for Huguenot refugee community.
André Raison, French Baroque composer and organist.
Nick Raison, jazz pianist, father of Miranda Raison.
David Reinhardt, jazz guitarist, grandson of Django Reinhardt.
Renaud (1952-), pop-rock singer, anti-military activist, agnostic from a Protestant family.
Keith Richards (1943-), English blues and rock guitarist, descended from the Dupree family of silkweavers. 
André Rieu (1949–) Dutch violinist, descendant of the Rieu family of the Auvergne. 
Pierre Santerre, composer, music publisher of the Genevan Psalter.
Jean Servin (1530-), composer of music for Psalms, music publisher of the Genevan Psalter and musician.
Joe Sublett, American blues saxophonist.
Elizma Theron (1983-), South African singer.
Mary Travers (1936–2009), American pop singer, member of the group Peter, Paul and Mary.
Stevie Ray Vaughan (1954–1990), American blues guitarist, descendant of LaRue family and the Joquen and DuFour families.
Isaac Watts (1674–1748), hymnwriter ("When I Survey the Wondrous Cross", "Joy to the World" and "Our God, Our Help in Ages Past"), pastor and theologian, descended from the Taunton family. Key work: Logic, or the Right Use of Reason, in the Inquiry After Truth.

Pastors and theologians
Firmin Abauzit (1679-1767), theologian, philosopher, editor, librarian.
Jacques Abbadie (1654–1727), French theologian. Key work: Vindication of the Truth. 
Frank Jean Alexandre (1844-1922), pastor and theologian and  the official historian of French Protestantism at the end of the 19th Century.
Pierre Allègre, pastor.
Pierre Allix (1641–1717), pastor. Key work: Some Remarks Upon the Ecclesiastical History of the Ancient Churches of Piedmont.
Moses Amyraut (1596–1664), French theologian, proponent of Amyraldism. 
Friedrich von Ancillon (1767–1837), German pastor. 
Gabriel Astier, Camisard prophet.
Edouard Aubertin, pastor, Paris.
Israel Antoine Aufrère, chaplain to William III, minister at the Savoy Chapel, director of the London French Hospital.
Charles-Édouard Babut (1835-1916), pastor, Nîmes. Even Catholics respected him so much they nicknamed him the "Saint of Nîmes".
Henry Babut, pastor, pacifist, co-founder of Peace Through Law.
Étienne Bach (1892-1986), pastor, pacifist, founder of the Movement of the Knights of the Prince of Peace, an ecumenical lay movement concerned with building lasting peace by working for reconciliation between Christians in Europe.
Jeab Barbeyrac (1674–1744), German pastor.
Isaac Barbauld, pastor.
Madeleine Barot (1909–1995), theologian and pacifist, co-founder of the Cimade.
Daniel Bas, Camisard lay preacher.
Henry Bidleman Bascom, US Congressional chaplain, Methodist bishop
Jacques Basnage (1653–1723), theologian. Key work: Instructions pastorales aux Réformés de France sur l'obéissance due aux souverains. 
André Bastide, pastor.
Marc-Antoine Benoist, pastor.
Michel Berauld, pastor.
Jacques Bernard (1658-1718), theologian.
Charles Bertheau (1660–1732), pastor.
Theodore Beza, French theologian. Key work:  Treasure of Gospel Truth. 
Jean Bion, chaplain to galley slaves. Key work:  An Account of the Torments the French Protestants Endure Aboard the Galleys.
Michel Block, pastor, member of the conservative, Biblically faithful group, Les Attestants, and Christian pacifist.
David Blondel (1691–1655), French clergyman, historian, classical scholar.
Samuel Bochart (1599–1667), theologian and pacifist. Key work: Geographia Sacra seu Phaleg et Canaan. 
Henri Boegner, pastor, brother of Marc Boegner, member of Association Sully, a now-defunct Protestant royalist movement.
Marc Boegner (1881–1970), theologian, pastor, ecumenist. Key work: Long Road to Unity: Memories and Anticipations. 
Laurent du Bois, Boston pastor.
Daniel Bondet (1652-1723), pastor in the United States of America.
Ami Bost (1790-1874), pastor, father of John Bost.
Gilles Boucomont, pastor, founder and head of Les Attestants (a conservative, Biblically faithful group), gay conversion therapy practitioner, opponent of blessing same-sex marriages.
Louis Bourgeois, theologian from Leiden.
Pierre Brisbar, pastor.
Brother Roger (1915–2005), founder of Taizé, Christian pacifist and ecumenist. Key work: Sources of Taizé: No Greater Love.
Heinrich Bullinger (1504–1575), theologian. Key work: The Decades.
Jean Bulteel, pastor.
Jean Cadier (1898-1981), theologian, signatory to the Pomeyrol Theses.
John Calvin (1509–1564), French theologian, pastor, and reformer. Key work: Institutes of the Christian Religion. 
Louis Cappel, French clergyman, Hebrew scholar.
George Casalis (1917-1987), pastor, prison chaplain at Spandau, theologian, great-grandson of Eugène Casalis and great-nephew of Alfred Casalis.
Jean Casamajor, pastor.
Sebastian Castellio (1515–1563), theologian, early proponent of freedom of conscience. Key work: Advice to a Desolate France.
Guillaume Centurier (1776–1829), German pastor.
Isaac Centurier, (1745–1816), German pastor.
Alfred-Henri Chaber (1880-1955), pastor, co-founded the reformed temple of Brueys, member of Association Sully, a now-defunct Protestant royalist movement.
Daniel Chamier, theologian, ancestor of actor Daniel Craig, co-drafter of the Edict of Nantes.
Michel Charles, pastor.
Daniel Charnier, pastor.
Guillaume Chartier, theologian.
Richard Chenevix, Irish Anglican bishop, descended from the Chenevix family of Metz, Lorraine.
Robert Chéradame, pastor.
Frank Christol, French pastor in London in World War Two.
Isaac Claude (1653-1695), theologian.
Jean Claude (1619–1687), theologian. 
Jean Jacques Claude, pastor, Threadneedle Street, grandson of Jean Claude.
François Clavairoly (1957-), pastor, former prison chaplain, former chair the regional council of the Nord-Normandie region, President of the Protestant Federation of France since 2013, member of the steering committee of the Amitié Judéo-Chrétienne de France Association, chairman of the Commission for Relations with Judaism of the Protestant Federation of France and ecumenist.
Julien Coffinet, pastor and member of the conservative, Biblically faithful group, Les Attestants.
Timothée Colani (1824-1888), liberal theologian.
Jean Constans, pastor.
Athanase Laurent Charles Coquerel (1795-1868), liberal theologian, elected deputy of the Constituent Assembly after the revolution of February 1848.
Athanase Josué Coquerel (1820–1875), liberal theologian, co-founder of the Historical Society of French Protestantism. Key work: La Saint-Barthélémy. 
Charles Eugene Correvon (1856–1928), German pastor.
Jacques Couet (1546-1608), pastor.
Antoine Court (1695–1760), pastor. Key work: An Historical Memorial of the Most Remarkable Proceedings Against the Protestants in France from 1744-51.
Pierre Courthial (1914-2009), pastor and neo-Calvinist theologian, participated in the writing of the Pomeyrol Theses which called for spiritual resistance to Nazism, member of Association Sully, a now-defunct Protestant royalist movement. Key work: From Bible to Bible.
Jean Crespin (1520–1572), martyrologist. Key work: Lives of the Martyrs.
Oscar Cullmann (1902–1999), theologian and ecumenist.
Jean Daillé (1594-1670), French theologian. Key work: Apology for the French Reformed Churches. 
Lambert Daneau (1530–1590), theologian. Key work: Wonderful Workmanship of the World.
Charles Daubuz (1673-1713), pastor, theologian, eschatologist. Key work: A Perpetual Commentary on the Revelation of St. John.
Jean-Marc Daumas (1953-2013), pastor, writer, historian, member of the Union of Monarchist Protestants, the modern successor of Association Sully.
Daniel De Barthe, pastor and theoloigian.
Bérard de Beaujardin (1618-1693), pastor, theologian.
Isaac de Beausobre (1659-1738), pastor.
David de Bonrepos, pastor in the United States of America.
Jacques de Brissac, pastor, theologian.
Thomas de Buisson, pastor, pacifist.
Hugues de Cabrol (1909-2001), pastor, member of Association Sully,  a now-defunct Protestant royalist movement.
Charles de Claremont, pastor, religious revivalist at La Rochelle.
Guillaume de Clermont, pastor, regional synod president.
Odet de Coligny (1517–1571), former Roman Catholic cardinal, convert to Protestantism. 
Suzanne de Dietrich (1891–1981), theologian, Cimade worker, co-writer of the Pomeyrol Theses and pacifist (French Lutheran).
Guillaume de Félice, Comte de Panzutti, French abolitionist,  theologian.
Leon Degrémont, pastor.
Jessé de Forest, leader of a group of Walloon-Huguenots who fled Europe due to religious persecutions.
Isaac de Juigné, pastor.
Jean de Labadie (1610-1674), Jesuit convert to Calvinism, founder of the pietistic  Labadists.
Antoine de la Roche Chandieu, Parisian pastor, co-author with Calvin of the Galllican Confession of Faith.
Josué de la Place (c. 1596 – 1665 or possibly 1655), pastor, theologian.
Samuel Delon Perille, pastor.
Jean Delpech, pastor.
Pierre Delpuech, pastor.
Philippe de Mornay (1549–1623), theologian. Key work (likely author): Vindiciae contra tyrannos. 
Antoine-Noé de Polier de Bottens (1713-1783), theologian.
Edmond de Pressensé (1824-1891), student of Alexandre Vinet, theologian, pastor, writer, first president of the Human Rights League, father of Francis de Pressensé. Key work: Jesus Christ : his times, life, and work.
Roland de Pury (1907-1979), pastor, anti-Nazi activist, saviour of Jews in World War Two,  opponent of the use of torture in the Algerian War and anti-Communist. He is the author of a Cell Journal written during his captivity by the Nazis. He was a signatory of the Pomeyrol Theses.
Jacob de Rouffignac, refugee pastor in Essex.
Stéphane Desmarais, Pastor of the French Church in London.
Jochen Desel, pastor, former  president of the German Huguenot Society.
Nicolas des Gallars (1520–1580), theologian, pastor at Threadneedle Street.
Bernard de Sonis, pastor.
Jean d’Espagne, chaplain.
Christophe Desplanque, pastor, pacifist and member of Les Attestants, a group opposing theological liberalism and seeking to return the French Church to the traditional Huguenot belief in the "sovereign authority of the Biblical Word for the life of Christians..."
Daniel de Superville (1657-1728), pastor.
Vinchon des Voeux, pastor of French Church in Dublin, from Rouen.
Jacques de Veines, pastor.
Alphonse de Vignolles (1649–1744), German pastor.
Pierre Loyseleur de Villiers, pastor, Threadneedle Street.
Isaac d'Hussieau (1607-1672), pastor, theologian.
Paul Doumergue, pastor.
Charles Drelincourt (1595–1669), pastor. Key work: The Christian's Defence Against the Fears of Death.
Laurent Drelincourt (1626–1681), theologian, pastor, poet, son of Charles Drelincourt.
Clemens du Bois, pastor, Hanau.
Jacob Duché (1737–1798), pastor in Philadelphia, USA.
Pierre Du Moulin (1568–1658), pastor. Key works: Tyranny that the Popes Exercised for Some Centuries Over the kings of England and The Christian Combate, or, A treatise of Affliction: with a Prayer and Meditation of the Faithfull Soule. 
Jehan Duperche, pastor.
Francois Loumeau Dupont, the pastor of the French Church in Edinburgh.
Philip Dupont, pastor.
Francis Durand, convert from Roman Catholicism, became pastor of the French Church at Canterbury.
John Durel, pastor who later became an Anglican minister.
Theodore Dury (Du Ry) (born 1661), pastor.
Isaac du Soul (1596-1676), pastor, theologian.
Jacques Ellul (1912–1994), theologian and pacifist. Key work: Propaganda: The Formation of Men's Attitudes. 
Pierre Encontre, pastor.
Jean Pierre Erman (1735–1814), German pastor and schoolmaster.
David Eustache, pastor.
Tommy Fallot (1844–1904), pastor, founder of Social Christianity. Key work: Christianisme social, études et fragments (French Lutheran).
William Farel (1489–1565), theologian who recruited Calvin to Geneva. 
Jean Faucher, pastor and theologian.
Abraham Faure (1795-1875), South African pastor and author.
Jean Jacques Favre, pastor.
Louis Fayet, pastor.
Patrice Fondja, pastor and member of the conservative, Biblically faithful group, Les Attestants.
Jacques Fontaine, pastor in Cork, weaver, fisherman.
Jean Samuel Formey (1711–1797), theologian and historian.
Sébastien Fresse, pastor and member of the conservative, Biblically faithful group, Les Attestants.
Gaston Frommel (1862-1906), French theologian.
Jacques Gaillard, pastor and theologian.
John Gano, Baptist preacher and Revolutionary War chaplain.
John Gast (1715-1788), Irish minister.
François Gaussen (1790–1863), pastor and eschatologist, Calvinist who was influential on the early Seventh Day Adventists. Key works: Theopneusty; Or, the Plenary Inspiration of the Holy Scriptures and The Prophet Daniel Explained. In a Series of Readings for Young Persons. 
Pascal Geoffroy, pastor and member of the conservative, Biblically faithful group, Les Attestants.
Simon Gibert, pastor.
Etienne Gibert, underground  pastor in the "Church of the Desert" period and thereby one of the last refugees to arrive in Britain.
Jean Gigord, theologian.
Simon Goulart (1543–1628), pastor, theologian and poet. 
André Gounelle (1933–), liberal and process theologian.
Élie Gounelle (1865–1950), pastor, liberal theologian, Social Christianity advocate.
Rémi Gounelle (1967-), theologian, nephew of André Gounelle.
Heinrich Grüber (1891–1975), theologian, opponent of Nazism and pacifist. 
Jean Guisot, pastor.
Matthias Helmlinger, pastor and member of the conservative, Biblically faithful group, Les Attestants.
Thomas Hervé, pastor, convert from Roman Catholicism.
Jean-Michel Hornus, theologian and pacifist. Key work: It is Not Lawful for Me to Fight: Early Christian Attitudes Toward War, Violence, and the State.
François Hotman (1524–1590), theologian. Key work: Francogallia. 
Hurtienne, German pastor.
Daniel Jamet, pastor.
Jean Jarousseau (1729–1819), pastor.
Edmond Jeanneret (1914–1990),  pastor.
Jules Jézéquel, pastor, pacifist, founder of the Universal Rally for Peace, vice-president of the Universal Alliance for International Friendship through the Churches.
Charles Estienne Jordan (1700–1745), German pastor, advisor to Frederick the Great.
Jean-Pierre Julian, pastor, regional synod president.
Pierre Jurieu, French pastor, orthodox Calvinist theologian and eschatologist. Key work: Pastoral Letters. 
Jacques Kaltenbach, pastor, Social Christianity advocate, mentor to André Trocmé.
Jean-Pierre Lafont, pastor.
Isaac La Peyrère (1596-1676), theologian, writer and lawyer, forced to convert to Roman Catholicism, retract his writings and spend his final years in a monastery.
François de La Pilonierre, Jesuit who converted to Protestantism and was obliged to flee the country as a result. Key work: Defense des Principes de la Tolerance.
Arnaud Lepine Lassagne, pastor and member of the conservative, Biblically faithful group, Les Attestants.
Jean Lasserre (1908–1983), conservative, Biblically orthodox theologian, pastor and pacifist. Key work: War and the Gospel 
Auguste Lecerf (1872-1943), pastor, neo-Calvinist theologian, specialist on the thought of Jean Calvin, member of Association Sully, a now-defunct Protestant royalist movement. Key work: An Introduction to Reformed Dogmatics.
Pierre-Olivier Léchot (1978–), theologian.
Henry Leenhardt (1900-1961), theologian.
Robert Le Maçon seigneur de la Fontaine, pastor, Threadneedle Street.
Andrew Le Mercier (1692–1764), pastor and writer.
François le Sueur, early South African pastor.
Josue Le Vasseur, pastor.
Frédéric Lichtenberger (1832-1899), evangelical pastor and theologian (French Lutheran).
Robert Lorent (1698–1782), pastor in Berlin.
Paul Lorrain (died 1719), secretary to Samuel Pepys, Anglican clergyman, ordinary of Newgate Prison
Andrew Lortie, theologian.
Francina Susanna Louw, missionary, linguist, sister of South African president C. F. Malan and descendant of Jacques Malan of Provence.
Jean Jacques Majendie (1709–1783), pastor of the Savoy Church in London.
Antoine Marcourt, pastor (the Posters Incident).
Élie Marion, Camisard prophet.
Paul-Henri Marron (1754–1832), first pastor to work in Paris after Protestantism was legalised because of the French Revolution.
Jacques Martin (1906–2001), pastor, pacifist, saviour of Jews in World War Two.
Joseph Martin-Paschoud (1802-1873), liberal pastor, pacifist, supporter of Frédéric Passy's peace society, supporter of French  Judaism.
Ètienne Mathiot, pastor, tried for sheltering Algerian boy during war.
Jacques Matthieu, pastor.
Basil Maturin, Anglican minister and writer who later converted to Roman Catholicism, Lusitania torpedoeing victim, grandson of Charles Maturin.
Gabriel Maturin (1700–1746), Irish clergyman and philanthropist
Jacques Maury (1920-2020), pastor, president of the French Protestant Federation.
Pierre Maury (1890–1956), pastor.
Joseph Meffre (1766–1845), pastor, convert from Roman Catholicism.
Pierre Merlin (died 1603), chaplain to Coligny, later pastor at La Rochelle and synod head.
Eugène Ménégoz  (1838-1921), symbolofideist theologian (French Lutheran).
Jean Mesnard (died 1727), pastor, French Protestant Chapel, Copenhagen, later a director of the London French Hospital.
Jean Mestrezat (1592-1657), French theologian and pastor.
Jean Mestrezat, pastor, Paris. One of the first pastors to work in the city after Protestantism was legalised.
Jean Mettayer, pastor, Soho.
Caesar de Missy (1703–1775), pastor, Savoy, London, chaplain to King George III.
Adolphe Monod (1802–1856), pastor.
Frédéric Monod (1794–1863), pastor.
Wilfred Monod (1867–1943), liberal theologian, Social Christianity supporter, founder of the Order of Watchers, argued for rehabilitation of Marcion and for the removal of omnipotence and omnipresence from the conception of God.
Wolfgang Musculus (1497–1563), theologian.
Beyers Naudé, South African anti-apartheid cleric.
Jozua Francois Naudé (1873-1948), South African pastor, school founder and co-founder of the Afrikaner Broederbond.
Elias Neau, Former galley slave, opponent of slavery in the United States, school founder.
Guy-Bertrand Ngougou-Fotso, pastor and member of the conservative, Biblically faithful group, Les Attestants.
Henri Nick (1868–1954), pastor, Social Christianity advocate, pacifist, saviour of Jews.
Moses Nicolas, Camisard prophet.
Johannes Ökolampad (1482–1531), reformer.
Olivétan (1506–1538), Bible translator.
Dacres Olivier (1826-1919), English Anglican minister, private chaplain to the Earl of Pembroke, later a canon of Salisbury Cathedral, conservative figure, father of Edith Olivier and related to Sir Laurence Olivier.
Joudain Olivier, pastor.
René Pache (1904-1979), theologian, pastor, writer, vice-president of the International Fellowship of Evangelical Students,  director of the Emmaus Bible and Missionary Institute in Lausanne, Switzerland. Key work: The Future Life.
Claude Pajon (1626–1685), pastor. 
John Rawstorne Papillon, Anglican clergyman, descendant of Huguenot refugee David Papillon.
Eric Pasteur, pastor and member of the conservative, Biblically faithful group, Les Attestants.
Félix Pécaut (1828–1898), pastor and educator.
Simon Pelloutier (1694–1757), French pastor in Berlin.
Louis Pernot (1959–), liberal pastor, classical lutist.
Marc Pernot (1958–), liberal pastor, former scientist and AI geographer, advocate of blessing same-sex marriages, advocate of Gounelle's process theology and  Caputo's "weak God" theology, rejector of the existence of Satan, former pastor of the Oratoire du Louvre in Paris and currently-serving pastor of  Geneva.
Eric Perrier, pastor and member of the conservative, Biblically faithful group, Les Attestants.
Jacques Pineton de Chambrun (1637-1689), theologian.
Abel Poupin (died 1556), pastor.
Jean Pradel, pastor.
Guiges Prévost, pastor,  Geneva.
David Primerose, pastor, Threadneedle Street.
Samuel Provoost (1742–1815), American clergyman.
François Puaux (1806-1895), evangelical pastor, vigorous debater and fiery opponent of liberals and Roman Catholics.
Jules Puech, pastor, pacifist.
Paul Rabaut (1718–1794), pastor. 
Olivier Raoul-Duval, pastor and member of the conservative, Biblically faithful group, Les Attestants.
François Rapiné, pastor, tried for sheltering Algerian boy during war.
Jean François Reclam (1778–1831), French pastor in Berlin.
Jacques Reclus (1796–1882), pastor. 
Charles Renouvier, theologian.
Albert Réville (1826-1906), pastor, extreme liberal theologian, Dreyfus supporter.
Zacharie Richard, pastor.
Jean Richaud, pastor.
Claude Richier, pastor.
David Richier, pastor.
André Rivet (1572–1651), theologian. 
Albert Rivett (1855–1934), Australian Congregationalist minister and pacifist, father of the scientist, David Rivett.
William Romaine (1714-1795), evangelical Anglican minister. Key work: The Life, Walk and Triumph of Faith.
Roman the Paquetou, Camisard lay preacher.
Camille Rombaut, pastor, pacifist.
Pierre Roques (1685–1748), pastor.
Hermann Roquette (1815–1890), French-Reformed minister in Königsberg.
Henri Roser (1899–1981), pastor and pacifist (French Lutheran).
Auguste Sabatier (1839-1901), symbolofideist, called by some  "the greatest French theologian since Calvin", expert on dogma and the links between theology and culture (French Lutheran).
Daniel Sanxay, clergyman.
Claude Saumeis (died 1652), pastor.
Jacques Saurin (1677–1730), pastor, Threadneedle Street and the Netherlands refugee communities, early advocate of religious tolerance. Key work: Sermons on Diverse Texts of the Scriptures. 
François Saussine, pastor.
Pierre Saussine, pastor.
Edmond Scherer (1815-1889), liberal theologian, agnostic.
Laurent Schlumberger (1957–), first President of the United Protestant Church of France from 2013 to 2017.
Albert Schweitzer (1875-1965), liberal/unorthodox theologian and pastor, missionary, hospital founder, organist, musicologist, writer, humanitarian, philosopher, physician, had pacifist leanings, Nobel Peace Prize winner 1953, Lutheran from Alsace.
Claude Scoffier, pastor.
Paul Secrétan, theologian.
Peter Serrurier  pastor, Amsterdam.
Pierre Sestier, pastor.
Pierre Simon, first Huguenot pastor in South Africa.
Édouard Soulier (1870-1938), pastor and politician, worked for "Christianity Against Communism".
Charles Spurgeon (1834–1892), first pastor of the Metropolitan Tabernacle, founder of a theological college, almshouses and orphanage, writer.
Jacques Stewart, former head of the Protestant Federation of France.
Ch.H.P. Suchier (1730–1794), French-Reformed minister in Karlshafen.
Jean Tenans, pastor.
Édouard Theis, pastor, aide to André Trocmé, saviour of Jews.
Albert Thibaudet, pastor, pacifist.
André Thobois (1924-2012), pastor,  vice-president of the Protestant Federation of France,  president of the Association of Professing Churches, president of the Biblical Alliance French, President of the Council of the Free Faculty of Evangelical Theology of Vaux-sur-Seine, author (French Baptist).
Henri Tollin (1833–1902), pastor in Magdeburg, founder of the German Huguenot Society.
Pierre-Charles Toureille (1900–1976), pastor, Cimade worker, chaplain to French concentration camp prisoners and saviour of Jews in World War Two.
Daniel Toussain (1541-1602), pastor, Basel.
André Trocmé (1901–1971), French theologically conservative pastor, Christian pacifist, saviour of Jews in World War Two and anti-nuclear campaigner. Key work:  Jesus and the Nonviolent Revolution. 
Antoine Vermeil, pastor.
Philippe Vernier, pastor, pacifist.
Isabeau Vincent, prophetess.
Paul Vincent, pastor.
Alexandre Vinet (1797-1847), theologian, considered the most important thinker of nineteenth century French-speaking Protestantism. Key work: Homiletics; or the Theory of Preaching. 
Pierre Viret (1511–1572), theologian. Key work: Thou Shalt Not Kill. 
Charles Wagner (1852–1918), pastor, liberal theologian, Social Christianity advocate. 
Noé Walter, pastor and member of the conservative, Biblically faithful group, Les Attestants, pacifist.
Charles Westphal, pastor.
James Woody, pastor, head of French Protestantism's liberal group, advocate of blessing same-sex marriages, and anti-pacifist.
John Yver, refugee pastor in several churches in London, then Holland.

Philanthropists and charity workers
Jaques-Pierre André, a director of the French Hospital in London.
Henriette André-Walther (1807-1886), supporter of the Paris Evangelical Mission Society and the Association of Deaconesses of Reuilly, turned her estate, Les Ombrages, into a meeting place for Protestants of an evangelical persuasion, and then into an infirmary, and then into an orphanage for boys  and then into a reception centre for a wide variety of refugees during the 1871 Paris Commune. She was also very concerned about the plight of the working class and advocated for social reform on their behalf. She lived simply and humbly, despite her wealth.
Jaques Baudouin, director of the French Hospital.
Madeleine Barot (1909-1995), laywoman, saviour of Jews in World War Two, co-writer of the Pomeyrol Theses, evangelist, ecumenist, vice-president of Christian Action for the Abolition of Torture, general secretary of La Cimade.
Eugenie Bost, philanthropist, memoirist, wife of John Bost.
John Bost (1817-1881), pastor, musician and philanthropist, founder of La Famille (the Family) asylum at La Force in Dordogne for children, orphans, the  disabled and incurables. It was followed by a number of other asylums, run today by the John Bost Foundation.
Arthur Giraud Browning (1835-1907), governor of the Westminster School,   director of the French Hospital and co-founder of the London Huguenot Society.
Anna Bullinger (1504–1564), former nun, wife of Heinrich Bullinger, known for caring for refugees and the homeless, including English Protestants fleeing from persecution under Queen Mary. Commended by Queen Elizabeth I for this work.
Antoinette Butte (1898-1986), French Girl Scouts co-founder. 
François Henri Ernest Chabaud-Latour (1804–1885), French Bible Society chairman.
Évelyne Chazot (1883-1968), saviour of Jews in World War Two.
René Courin, lay worker, co-author of the Pomeyrol Theses.
Suzanne Curchod (1737-1794), hospital founder, writer and salonist, wife of Jacques Necker.
Roger Darcissac, aide to André Trocmé, saviour of Jews in World War Two.
Jacques de Gastigny (died 1708), master of the royal buckhounds, philanthropist whose bequest was used to found the London French Hospital.
Nicole Deheuvels, director, Le Service Éliézer (part of La Cause).
Pierre de La Primaudaye, a governor of the London French Hospital.
Malcolm Delevingne (1868–1950), Barnado's charity worker, occupational health and safety and anti-drug advocate, public servant. 
Henri de Sainte-Colome, director of La Soupe soup kitchen charity and of the French Hospital.
Jean-Jacques de Sellon (1782-1839), member of the nobility, opponent of capital punishment,  pacifist, founder of the Société de la Paix de Génève, the first modern continental anti-war organisation.
Valentine de Sellon, pacifist, anti-war activist, daughter of Jean-Jacques, comte de Sellon.
Jacques Louis des Ormeaux, a director of the London French Hospital.
Pierre de Tascher, a director of the London French Hospital.
Louis De Tudert (died 1739), director of the London French Hospital, left bequests to the Hospital and to La Soupe.
Marguerite de Witt-Schlumberger (1853–1924),  philanthropist and non-violent resistor to German rule in Alsace. 
Frederick Eccleston du Faur (1832–1915), British-born Australian patron of the arts.
Suzette Duflo (1910-1983), president of the Mouvement Jeunes Femmes from 1949 to 1956 and of the Christian Union for Young Girls from 1956 to 1961.
Henri Dunant (1828-1910), founder of the Red Cross, Nobel Peace Prize winner.
Christophe Durrleman (1921-2001), director of La Cause from 1954, son of Freddy Durrleman.
Freddy Durrleman (1881-1944), founder of  La Cause, a Protestant organization dedicated to social work (organising adoptions, providing assistance to the blind and arranging marriages) and evangelization in France, pastor.
Valdo Durrleman (1910-1944), La Cause worker, pastor, son of Freddy Durrleman.
Edith du Tertre (1912-2005), co-founder, Action by Christians for the Abolition of Torture.
Hélène Engel (1902-1984), co-founder, Action by Christians for the Abolition of Torture.
Léon Eyraud (1883–1953), saviour of Jews, Christian pacifist, aide to André Trocmé.
Jane Franklin (1791–1875), wife of Sir John Franklin, First Lady of Tasmania,  philanthropist, patron of the arts, descended from the Griffin and Guillemard silkweaving families. 
François-Arnail, Marquis of Jaucourt (1757–1852), Protestant Bible Society chairman, freemason.
Peter Paul Grellier (1773–1828),  a director of the French Hospital.
Richard Grellier (1801–1863),  a director of the French Hospital.
Jean Griffin, a director of the French Hospital and an ancestor of Lady Jane Franklin, descended from the Griffin silkweaving family of Normandy.
Elisabeth Gruzon, member of Young Women association.
Henry John Guinand (1756), fundraiser for numerous charities, sub-governor of the French Hospital in London.
David Hubert, founder of the French Protestant Charity School.
L. Stanley Johnson (died 1941), director of French Hospital in London.
Adèle Kamm (1885-1911), terminally-ill girl, founded an association where hospital patients could share their thoughts with each other in a diary, "Les Ladybugs", and write their testimonies. This grew into an organisation, the Union des Coccinelles, which visits the sick in hospital. She also wrote the pamphlet, "Joyful in Affliction" (1910).
Armand Laferrère, political advisor and  member of the board of directors of the Franco-Israeli Friendship Association.
Daniel Legrand (1783–1858), philanthropist and industrialist, grandfather of Tommy Fallot. 
Ashurst Majendie (1784–1867), a director of French Hospital and one of the Assistant Poor Law Commissioners.
Caroline Malvesin (1806-1889), founder of a Protestant order for women.
Philippe Ménard, founder of the London French Hospital.
Geneviève Monod, member of Young Women association.
Sarah Monod (1836-1912), philanthropist and feminist, daughter of Adolphe Monod.
Violette Mouchon (1893-1985), French Girl Scouts co-founder. 
Felix Neff (1798–1829), pastor and philanthropist.
J. F. Oberlin (1740–1826), pastor, philanthropist and social reformer (French Lutheran).
Daniel Olivier (1722–1782), a director of the French Hospital in London.
Henry William Peek (died 1898), director and deputy governor of the French Hospital and founding member of the Huguenot Society of London.
Émile Peugeot, peace and charity worker, created relief organisations and built a hospital where Peugeot employees would receive free health care and other social benefits (French Lutheran).
Lucy Peugeot (died 1928), peace and charity worker (French Lutheran).
Robert Lewis Roumieu (1814–1877), British architect, governor of the Foundling Hospital, London; honorary architect and director of the French Hospital, co-founder of the Huguenot Society of which he was treasurer and later president.
Jacques Saussine (died 1942), theology student, Cimade worker  (aided Jews in prison camps in World War Two), nephew of Pierre-Charles Toureille.
Charles John Shoppee (1823-1897), co-founder of Huguenot Society of London and director of the French Hospital.
James Tillard (1754-1828),  philanthropist, repaired and rebuilt churches, donated to hospitals, asylums and the distressed,  member of the Society for the Propagation of the Gospel in Foreign Parts, bequeathed £30,000 towards the work of the Society in Calcutta.
Magda Trocmé (1901-1996), laywoman, wife of André Trocmé, saviour of Jews in World War Two, anti-nuclear activist.
Leonard Turquand, a director of the French Hospital in London.
Randolph Vigne (1928–2016), South African, President of the Huguenot Society of Great Britain, editor of its publications, director and treasurer of the French Hospital of London, Huguenot researcher and contributor to various publications on Huguenot history.
Henry Wagner (1840-1926), donor to Huguenot Library, director of the French Hospital.
Marguerite Walther (1882-1942), French Girl Scouts co-founder.
Frederick Winsor, director of the French Hospital.

Philosophers
Olivier Abel (1953-), philosopher.
Raoul Allier (1862-1939), philosopher, Social Christianity advocate, Dreyfus supporter, Laicité law supporter, war inciter in World War One.
Charles Andler (1866-1934), philosopher, pacifist.
Pierre Bayle (1647–1706), French philosopher.
Jean Cavaillés, philosopher, pacifist.
Jacques Maritain (1882-1973), philosopher from Protestant family, converted to Roman Catholicism, drafter of Universal Declaration of Human Rights.
James Martineau (1805–1900), English philosopher, educator, Unitarian minister, descended from Gaston Martineau, a Huguenot surgeon and refugee.
Paul Ricœur (1913–2005), philosopher and pacifist.
Jean-Jacques Rousseau (1712–1778), Swiss writer, philosopher, social and educational theorist, descended from Huguenot wine merchant, Didier Rousseau, Jean-Jacques converted to an unorthodox form of Calvinism himself, rejecting original sin and some other key tenets of mainstream Calvinist faith. 
Théodore Eugène César Ruyssen (1868–1967), philosopher and pacifist, president of Peace Through Law.

Pioneers and explorers
Gabriel Bernon (1644-1736), merchant, undertaker, American pioneer, born in La Rochelle, with ancestors from Froissart.
Charles Bonney (1813–1897), Australian pioneer. 
Guillaume Henri Bossau, South African pioneer.
Jean de Buis, South African pioneer.
William Byrd I (1652–1704), early Virginia settler.
Jacques Caudebec (1664–1766), American pioneer, originally from Bolbec.
Josue Cellier, South African pioneer.
Samuel de Champlain (1567–1635), French explorer, founded Québec City, born into a Huguenot family, died a Roman Catholic
Guillaume Chartier, theologian, French Antarctique colonist.
Louis Cordier (1777–1861), South African pioneer.
Davy Crockett (1786–1836), American folk hero and the descendant of one Monsieur de la Croquetagne, a captain in the Royal Guard of French King Louis XIV, whose family converted to Protestantism, fled France and settled in the north of Ireland.
Pierre Cronje, South African pioneer.
Philippe de Corguilleray, colonist, French Antarctique.
Catherine DuBois (1627-1713), pioneer in America, held prisoner with her children by the Esopus tribe for a time, wife of Louis DuBois, from Artois.
Louis Dubois (1626–1696), colonist to New Netherland, co-founded New Paltz, New York, ancestor of Hollywood actors Marlon Brando and Joan Crawford, from Artois.
Pierre Du Gua, Sieur de Monts (1558–1628), French colonizer of Canada.
Bartholomew Dupuy (1652-1742), American pioneer settler.
Ralph Durand (1876–1945), explorer.
Mareen Duvall (1625–1694), early Maryland settler originally from Nantes, ancestor of Wallis Simpson and actor Robert Duvall.
Tobias Furneaux (1735-1781), British explorer, charted coastal areas of Tasmania. 
Daniel Hugot, South African pioneer.
Jean Jourdaan, South African pioneer.
Abraham de Klerk, South African pioneer.
Jacques de la Porte, South African pioneer.
René Goulaine de Laudonnière (1529–1574), French explorer.
Jean de Léry (1536–1613), pastor and explorer of Brazil.
Hugh L'Amy, North American colony proposist.
Peter Le Pruvost, North American colony proposist.
Meriwether Lewis (1774–1809), American explorer.
Hester Mahieu (1582–1666), wife of Francis Cooke, captain of the Mayflower, daughter of French-speaking Calvinists Jacques and Jenne/Jeanne Mahieu, from Lille.
Pierre Manigault (1664–1729), American pioneer born in La Rochelle.
Charles Marais, South African pioneer.
Nicolas Martiau (1591–1657), American pioneer.
Jacques Mouton, South African pioneer.
Guillaume Néel, South African pioneer, from Rouen.
Daniel Perrin (1642–1719), one of the first permanent European inhabitants of Staten Island, New York originally from Normandy, ancestor of American actress Valerie Perrine.
Hercule des Prez, South African pioneer.
Pierre Richier (1506–1580), pastor, French Antarctique colonist, later took lead role in turning La Rochelle into a leading Huguenot centre.
Pierre Rousseau, South African pioneer, from Blois.
Abraham Salle (1670–1719), immigrant and American colonist.
Andrew Sigourney (1638-1727), American pioneer, born in St. Jean d'Angély in Saintonge, France.
Jedediah Smith, American explorer, mountain man
Jacques Therond, South African pioneer.
Pierre de Villiers, South African pioneer.
Francois Villion, South African pioneer.

Politicians
Thomas Henry Barclay, American Loyalist during the American Revolutionary War and pre-Confederation Nova Scotian politician.
Antoine Barnave (1761-1783), French revolutionary, tried to establish a French constitutional monarchy, member of the Feuillants.
Isaac Barré, British politician, gave his name to Wilkes-Barre, Pennsylvania; Barre, Massachusetts; and Barre, Vermont.
Ruth Bascom, American politician, mayor of Eugene, Oregon.
Paul Bastide, politician, former member of the Constitutional Council.
James A. Bayard, US Congressman.
Moïse Bayle, French revolutionary, member of the Committee of General Security.
John M. Berrien, United States senator from Georgia and Andrew Jackson's Attorney General.
Christian Blanc (1942-), centre-right politician (UDF Party), prefect. 
Alain Bombard (1924-2005), Socialist Party politician.
Jacob Bosanquet (1755-1828), English politician, opponent of Napoleon Bonaparte, grandson of David Bosanquet who had taken refuge from Languedoc.
Jessie Boucherett, English campaigner for women's rights.
Elias Boudinot (1740–1821), president of the American  Continental Congress, descended from the Boudinot family of Marans, Aunis, France.
James Bowdoin, Governor of Massachusetts.
James Bowdoin III, American statesman, philanthropist, benefactor of Bowdoin College.
Alain Boyer, prefect.
Bryant Butler Brooks, Governor of Wyoming.
Jean Bude, councillor, Household of the King.
James Bulteel (1676-1757), British politician.
Marie Byles (1900–1979), Australian environmentalist, feminist and Buddhist, descended from the Beuzeville family of Normandy.
Pierre-Joseph Cambon (1756-1820), French revolutionary, opponent of Robespierre, advocate of the separation of church and state, member of the Feuillants.
François Caron (1600–1673), French Director-General of the Dutch East India Company and the French East Indies Company.
Victor Cazalet (1896-1943), British Conservative Party politician, supporter of Zionism, grandson of Edward Cazalet, godson of Queen Victoria, Huguenot ancestors were from Languedoc.
Christophe Chappuzeau, chamber secretary.
Winston Churchill (1874-1965), British prime minister, descendant of Timothy Chauncey Jerome. 
Sarel Cilliers, Boer Voortrekker.
Georges Clemenceau (1841-1929), centrist politician, French prime minister, mother was a Huguenot descendant.
Jean-Pierre Cot (1937-), Socialist Party politician.
Minard Crommelin (1881–1972), Australian conservationist. 
Clementine Crozier (1885-1977), wife of Winston Churchill.
François Boissy d'Anglas (1756–1826), French revolutionary.
Richard Walther Darré (1895–1953), NSDAP Reich Agricultural Minister.
Jean de Bar baron de Mauzac, French nobleman.
Olivier de Beaulieu Marconnay, Master of the Hunt.
Jean de Caumont baron of Montbeton, French nobleman.
Paul de Caumont-Montbeton, courtier.
Arnaud de Cavagnes, French nobleman.
Guillaume de Croy marquis de Renty, French nobleman.
Gaston Defferre (1910-1986), Socialist Party politician, mayor of Marseille.
Thomas-Augustin de Gasparin (1754-1793), French revolutionary.
Frederik Willem de Klerk (1936–2021), President of the Republic of South Africa, September 1989 – May 1994, Nobel Prize laureate. 
James DeLancey, Governor of New York.
Jean-François de la Roque de Roberval (1495-1560), first lieutenant governor of French Canada.
Marie de La Tour d'Auvergne (1601-1665), French noblewoman. 
Gabriel de Lorges comte de Montgomery, French nobleman.
Lothar de Maizière (1940-), German Christian Democrat politician.
Thomas de Maizière (1954-), German Christian Democrat  politician, cousin of Lothar de Maizière.
Maurice Couve de Murville (1907-1999), right-wing (UDR party), French Prime Minister. 
Henri de Pouguet de Faillac, courtier.
Francis de Pressensé (1853-1914), one of the founders and first president of the Human Rights League, Dreyfus supporter.
Isaac De Riemer, Mayor of New York City..
Jacques-Jacob de Rossel Baron d'Aigaliers (1671-1708), Huguenot leader.
Jacques de Ségur-Pardaillon, French nobleman.
Étienne de Seynes (1859-1930),  conservative  politician, brother of Louis de Seynes.
Jean Julien de Toulouse, French revolutionary, pastor, member of the Committee of General Security.
William Deveynes, politician, director of the East India Company, director of the London French Hospital.
Conrad de Witt, right-wing politician, only deputy on the right to support Dreyfus, Guizot's son-in-law.
Georgina Dufoix (1942-), Socialist Party politician.
Clifford Dupont (1905-1978), the first president of Rhodesia, 1970–1976.
Pierre Samuel du Pont de Nemours (1739-1817), French writer, economist, government official.
Alexander du Pre, 2nd Earl of Caledon, Governor of the Cape of Good Hope, 1806–1811
Antoine Durrleman (1951-), right-wing politician, member of cabinet of the conservative Prime Minister Jacques Chirac, adviser for social affairs to Prime Minister Alain Juppé, historian, La Cause volunteer, grandson of Freddy Durrleman, son of Christophe Durrleman.
D. F. du Toit, co-founder of Afrikaans language movement Society of Real Afrikaners.
S. G. du Toit, co-founder of Afrikaans language movement Society of Real Afrikaners.
Stephanus Jacobus du Toit (1847-1911), co-founder of Afrikaans language movement Society of Real Afrikaners. 
Frédéric Eccard (1867-1952), French politician, worked for "Christianity Against Communism".
Friedrich Engels (1820–1895), Marxist, possibly descended from a Huguenot named L'Ange, Engels was raised as a Calvinist before exploring pandeism and then becoming an atheist.
Nigel Farage (1964-), British politician, former leader of UKIP.
George Fillioud, Socialist Party politician.
Geoffrey FitzClarence, British Conservative politician.
Peter Force (1790-1868), American politician, archivist.
Jacobus Johannes Fouché (1898-1980), President of South Africa.
Alonzo Garcelon, Governor of Maine.
Innocent Gentillet (1535–1588), politician and lawyer, opponent of Machiavellianism.
Marie Goegg (1826-1899), pacifist.
Al Gore, former vice-president of the United States
Hermann Göring, German politician, military leader, leading member of the NSDAP.
Alexander Hamilton (1755-1804), American Secretary of the Treasury, mother was a Huguenot refugee living in the West Indies.
Georges-Eugène Haussmann (1809-1891), politician, redesigned Paris (French Lutheran). 
James Francis Helvetius Hobler, Chief Clerk to the Lord Mayors of London
Sir James Houblon, merchant, Member of Parliament.
Sir John Houblon, First Governor of the Bank of England.
Jules Humbert-Droz (1891-1971), pastor,  secretary of the Communist International.
George Izard, Major General and Governor of Arkansas.
Ralph Izard, US Senator, President pro tempore of US Senate
Lionel Jospin (1937–), Socialist Party politician, French prime minister. 
Pierre Joxe (1934-), Socialist Party politician, Minister for the Interior and for Religion.
Julien of Toulouse (1750-1828), French revolutionary, pastor.
Eugénie Kestner, wife of Jules Ferry.
Jacques Lafleur (1932-2010), leader of the Caledonian Right.
Robert M. La Follette, Senator from Wisconsin, co-founder of the Progressive Party
Catherine Lalumière (1935-), Socialist Party politician.
Anne Germaine Larivée (Mme de Vermenoux) (1739-1783), noblewoman, founder of first Protestant-led salon. 
Charles La Trobe (1801–1875), first lieutenant-governor of the state of Victoria, Australia, descendant of Jean Latrobe, linen weaver from Montauban, formerly in Languedoc, who fled to Ireland.
Henry Laurens (1724–1792), president of the American Continental Congress.
John Henry Lefroy (1817-1890), Governor of Tasmania, cousin of Thomas Langlois Lefroy.
Thomas Langlois Lefroy (1776-1869), Irish politician and judge, ancestors from Cambrai.
Antoine Le Sage, lord of Saint Gervais (died 1662), advocate of parliament of Paris.
Ezra L'Hommedieu (1734-1811), American statesman.
Daniel François Malan (1874–1959), South African Prime Minister, elected on Apartheid platform, descendant of Jacques Malan from Provence.
Gideon Malherbe, co-founder of an Afrikaans language movement named the Society of Real Afrikaners.
Jean-Paul Marat (1743–1793), physician, French revolutionary, journalist, deist, father was a Protestant. 
Jan Masaryk, Czechoslovakian diplomat and politician
Louis Mermaz (1931-), Socialist Party politician, President of the National Assembly under Mitterrand.
Gouverneur Morris, American statesman, represented Pennsylvania in the Constitutional Convention
Jozua "Tom" Naudé (1889-1969), acting President of South Africa from 1967 to 1968.
Jacques Necker (1732–1804), finance minister. 
Barack Obama, American president, descendant of Mareen Duvall.
Sarah Palin, American politician, Governor of Alaska, US presidential candidate.
Philip Oxenden Papillon (1826-1899), British politician.
Frédéric Passy (1822-1912),  French economist, author and pacifist who was a founding member of several peace societies, joint winner of the Nobel Peace Prize in 1901 for his work in the European peace movement, a convert to Protestantism from Roman Catholicism.
Olivier Philippe, prefect of Ile-de-France.
George Poindexter, US Congressman.
Pierre Poujade (1920-2003), populist politician, small business spokesman.
David Provoost (1611–1656), Head of the Nine Men in New Amsterdam 1652, Notary Public, first sheriff of Breukelen (Brooklyn), counselor and attorney.
Nicole Questiaux (1930-), Socialist Party politician.
Pierre-Antoine Rabaut-Dupuis (1746-1808), Girondist political figure, French revolutionary, church lay worker, brother of Jean-Paul Rabaut Saint-Étienne.
Jacques Antoine Rabaut-Pommier (1744-1820), Girondist, French revolutionary, pastor, supporter of Napoleon Bonaparte, vaccination advocate, brother of Jean-Paul Rabaut Saint-Étienne.
Jean-Paul Rabaut Saint-Étienne (1743–1793), Girondist, French revolutionary, pastor, obtained formal recognition of Protestant civil rights from Louis XVI, son of Pastor Paul Rabaut. 
Piet Retief, Boer Voortrekker.
Eugène Réveillaud (1851–1935), politician and anti-Catholic activist.
Daniel Roberdeau, Congressman, militia general.
Michel Rocard (1930–2016), Socialist Party prime minister, Protestant descendant on his mother's side. 
Esmond Romilly, British socialist, anti-fascist
Samuel Romilly (1757–1818), English legal reformer, Member of Parliament, whose family came from Montpellier.
Franklin D. Roosevelt, 32nd President of the United States, descendant of Philippe de La Noye.
Sara Roosevelt, mother of Franklin D. Roosevelt, descendant of Philippe de La Noye.
Theodore Runyon, American lawyer, politician, Civil War general, New Jersey court judge, first US ambassador to Germany.
William Nelson Runyon, American lawyer, politician, Governor of New Jersey.
Jeanbon Saint-André (1749–1813), French revolutionary politician and pastor, Jacobin, member of the Committee for Public Safety.
Thilo Sarrazin, German economist, formerly politician and member of the executive board of the Deutsche Bundesbank.
Christian Sautter (1940-), Socialist Party politician, General Secretary under Mitterrand, son of a pastor.
Joseph Savory (1843-1941), Lord Mayor of London.
François Scheer, chief of staff to Mitterrand's Minister for Foreign Affairs.
Auguste Scheurer-Kestner (1833–1899), French Republican political leader and Dreyfus supporter, chemist, industrialist and politician. A republican, he was opposed to the empire of Napoleon III.
Julie Siegfried (1848–1922), political activist.
Jacques Soustelle (1912-1990),  politician, supporter of "French Algeria", ethnologist.
Sir John Stokes (1917-2003), British Conservative Party politician.
Eugène Terre'Blanche (1941-2010), South African nationalist political activist.
Peter Thelusson, politician and merchant.
Catherine Trautman, Socialist Party politician.
Henri Tricot, pastor, former anarchist, founder of the  Spiritual Communists.
Charles Tupper (1821–1915), Canadian father of Confederation, Premier of Nova Scotia (1864–1867), 7th Prime Minister of Canada (1896) was reputed to be a Huguenot descendant.
Louis Vallon, left-leaning Gaullist politician.
Clement Vasseret, prefect of Nice.
Renaud Vignol, politician, Ministry of Cooperation and Development.
Lucien Vochel, prefect of Ile-de-France.
Jean-Henri Voulland (1751-1801), French revolutionary, member of the Committee of General Security, opponent of Robespierre and the Committee of Public Safety, involved in the overthrow of Robespierre.
George Washington (1732–1799), American revolutionary and the first President of the United States, descendant of Nicholas Martiau.
Jean Zay (1904-1944), French anti-fascist politician.

Printers and booksellers
Conrad Badius (1462-1535), printer.
Matthias Bonhomme, printer.
Jean Bonnefoy, printer.
Thomas Courteau, printer.
Richard Crassott (1530-), music publisher of the Genevan Psalter.
Antoine Davodeau, printer.
Zacarie Durand, printer.
Hugues Sureau du Rosier, music publisher of the Genevan Psalter and pastor.
Henri Estienne (1528–1598), printer, son of Robert Estienne and father-in-law of Isaac Causabon.
Robert Estienne (1503–1559), Genevan printer. 
Michel Ferrier, music publisher of the Genevan Psalter.
John Christopher Le Blon, printer, weaver.
Adam Riveriz, printer.
Jean Riveriz, printer.
Didier Rousseau, bookseller, ancestor of Jean-Jacques Rousseau.
Paul van Sommer, printer, engraver.
Thomas Vautrollier (died 1587), printer.

Privateers
Nicolas Brigaut (1653–1686), privateer.
Guillaume Chaudet, privateer.
William II de La Marck (1542–1578), privateer. 
Jacques de Sores ("The Exterminating Angel"), privateer. 
Jean-Baptiste du Casse (1646–1715), privateer, son of Pastor Gaillard Ducasse. 
Alexandre Olivier Exquemelin (1645–1707), privateer, historian.
Jean Fleury (died 1527), privateer.
François le Clerc known as Jambe de Bois (or Wooden Leg) (died 1563), privateer.
Guillaume Le Testu, privateer.
Jean Le Vasseur, buccaneer, governor of Tortuga.

Royalty
Catherine, Duchess of Cambridge (1982-), one line of her family is descended from the Martineaus.
Constant d'Aubigné (1585–1647), French nobleman, son of Agrippa d'Aubigné, father of Madame de Maintenon, second wife of Louis XIV, convert to Roman Catholicism, convicted counterfeiter.
Charles III (1948–), British monarch, descended from the Bourbon Montpensier, Coligny, d'Olbreuse, Rohan and Ruvigny families.
Diana, Princess of Wales (1961–1997), descended from the Bourbon Vendome, Bulteel, Guinand, Navarre, Rochefoucauld, Ruvigny, Schomberg, and Thellusson families.
Elizabeth II (1926–2022), British monarch, descended from the Bourbon Montpensier, Coligny, d'Olbreuse, Rohan and Ruvigny families.
Frederick the Great of Prussia (1712–1786), son of Sophia Dorothea of Hanover and nephew of George II of Great Britain was matrilineally descended from Alexander II d'Esmiers, Marquis d'Olbreuse, a Huguenot. 
George II of Great Britain (1683–1760), son of Sophia Dorothea of Celle was matrilineally descended from Alexander II d'Esmiers, Marquis d'Olbreuse, a minor member of the French nobility and a Huguenot. 
George William  (1624–1705), Duke of Bunswig.
Johann Philipp Guichard II (1726–1798),
Heinrich Albrecht of Sayn-Wittgenstein-Hohenstein (1658–1723), mother was a Huguenot.
Henry IV of France, king of France. 
Louise de Coligny (1555–1620), wife of William the Silent. 
Renée de France (1510–1575), member of the royal family. 
Jeanne d'Albret (1528–1572), ruler, mother of Henri IV. 
Margaret of Valois-Angoulême (1492–1549), Queen of Navarre, short story writer (the Heptaméron) and patron of the arts. 
Eleonore d'Esmier d'Olbreuse (1639-1722), Countess of Wilhelmsburg, grandmother of King George II of Great Britain.
Wallis Simpson (1896–1986), wife of Edward VIII, descendant of Mareen Duvall.
Queen Victoria (1819-1901), Queen of the United Kingdom, Empress of the British Empire, had Huguenot ancestry via King George II.
William, Prince of Wales (1982–), heir to the British throne, has Huguenot ancestors on both sides of his family, including William of Orange, Charlotte de Bourbon Montpensier, the Marquis de Ruvigny, Viscount de Rohan, Gaspard de Coligny, Duke de Schonberg and the Rochefoucaulds.

Scientists and engineers
Florence Bascom (1862–1945), American geologist
Joseph Bazalgette (1819-1891), London sewer engineer.
Paul D. Boyer (1918–2018), American chemist, Nobel Prize winner.
Isambard Kingdom Brunel (1806–1859), engineer. 
Georges Cuvier (1769-1832), French naturalist and zoologist, founder of paleontology, opponent of evolutionary theory, proponent of the theory of catastrophism, creationist. 
Augustin Pyramus de Candolle, Swiss botanist
Abraham de Moivre (1667–1754), French-born British mathematician, insurance industry founder.
Augustus De Morgan, British mathematician
Pierre Jean Édouard Desor (1811–1882), German naturalist.
Emil du Bois-Reymond (1818–1896), German physiologist.
Alexander du Toit (1878-1948), South African geologist.
Daniel du Toit (1917-1981), South African astronomer.
Paul J. Flory (1910-1985), American chemist, Nobel Prize winner 
Abraham Humbert (1689–1761), German mathematician and engineer.
Danie G. Krige (1919-2013), South African mining engineer.
Charles Labelye, engineer.
Thomas Laby (1880–1946), Australian scientist.
Georges-Louis Le Sage (1724-1803), scientist.
Matthew Fontaine Maury, father of modern oceanography and naval meteorology
Jacques Monod (1910-1976), biologist, Nobel Prize winner, atheist from Huguenot family.
Théodore Monod (1902–2000), naturalist, explorer, activist.
Denis Papin (1647–1713), inventor of the pressure cooker and an early type of steam boat.

Arthur Alcock Rambaut, Royal Astronomer of Ireland, Radcliffe Observer at the Radcliffe Observatory, Oxford University
Roger Revelle, one of the first scientists to study global warming and tectonic plates
David Rivett (1885–1961), Australian scientist, helped found the CSIRO, son of a Congregationalist minister.
Francis Peyton Rous (1879-1970), American virologist, Nobel Prize winner.
Conrad Schlumberger (1878-1936), geophysicist.
Marcel Schlumberger (1884-1953), geophysicist.
Alexander von Humboldt (1769–1859), German naturalist.
Philipp von Jolly (1809-1884), German physicist and mathematician.
The Wright Brothers, American inventors and aviation pioneers, descended from the Huguenot Gano family of New Rochelle, New York.

Sportspeople
Richie Benaud (1930–2015), Australian cricketer, commentator. 
Andy Blignaut (1978–), Zimbabwean cricketer.
Bernard Bosanquet (1877–1936), English cricketer.
Roy Cazaly (1893–1963), Australian Rules footballer. 
Brandi Chastain (1968–), US soccer player. 
Ross Chastain (1992–), NASCAR driver
Tony Cottee (1965–), West Ham United and England footballer.
Piers Courage (1942–1970), English racing driver
Hansie Cronje (1969–2002), South African cricketer.
Phil de Glanville (1968–), England rugby union international
AB De Villiers (1984–), South African cricketer, practising Christian.
Dawie de Villiers (1940-2022), South African rugby union player, pastor and politician.
Fanie de Villiers (1964-), South African cricketer.
Jean de Villiers (1981-), South African rugby player.
Peter de Villiers (1957-), South African rugby coach.
Pieter de Villiers (1982-), South African hurdler.
Pieter de Villiers (1972-), South African rugby player.
Freda Du Faur (1882–1935), Australian mountaineer. 
Faf du Plessis (1984–), South African cricketer.
Morné du Plessis (1949-), South African rugby player.
Frik du Preez (1935-), South African rugby player.
Mignon du Preez (1989-), South African cricketer.
Hempies du Toit (1953-), South African rugby player and winemaker.
Francois du Toit Roux (1939–), South African rugby player.
Olivier Giroud (1986-), French  footballer.
Jürgen Hahn (1950–), German handball player.
Marius Joubert (1979-), South African rugby player.
Marnus Labuschagne (1994–), South African-born Australian cricketer. 
Frederick Le Roux (1882-1963), South African cricketer.
Garth Le Roux (1955-), South African cricketer.
Paul Michael Levesque (1969–), American pro wrestler famous under pseudonym of Triple H
Henri Monnier (1871-1941), founder of  Sporting Club Nîmois (SCN) in 1901, a football team for Protestants only, and the forerunner of Nîmes Olympique.
Andre Nel (1977–), South African cricketer.
Bertrand Peugeot, vice-president of the board of trustees of the French Golf Federation (French Lutheran).
Jean-Philippe Peugeot, head of the international department of the French Golf Federation (French Lutheran).
Roland Peugeot, member of the management committee of the French Golf Federation (French Lutheran).
François Pienaar (1967–), South African rugby player; captain of the first Springboks team to win the Rugby World Cup in 1995.
Elfrida Pigou (1911–1960), Canadian mountaineer
Rilee Rossouw (1989-), South African cricketer.
Michel Seydoux (1947-), head of Lille football club (LOSC) and film producer.
Juan "Rusty" Theron (1985–), South African cricketer.
Henry Vigne (1817-1898), English cricketer and clergyman.
Paul Visagie, South African  athlete.

Translators
Sarah Austin (1793-1867), translator of German language books who  did much to make Germany familiar to English readers.
Pierre Coste (1668-1747), translator. 
Marie De Cotteblanche (1520-1583), French noblewoman known for her skill in languages and translation of works from Spanish to French.
John Theophilus Desaguliers (1683-1744), translator, major figure in British Freemasonry, natural philosopher, clergyman, engineer, was elected to the Royal Society in 1714 as experimental assistant to Isaac Newton, born in La Rochelle.
Claudius Hollyband (1534-1594), translator, from Moulins.
Lewis Page Mercier (1820-1875), British translator of Jules Verne into English, reverend, grandson of a  Louis Mercier who was pastor at Threadneedle Street.

Weavers and textile manufacturers
Obadiah Agace, master weaver.
Joseph André, inventor of denim.
Christopher Baudouin (1662–1724), silk designer.
Peter Bourdon, Spitalfields master weaver.
James Briseau, weaver.
Daniel Cabbinell, master weaver.
Peter Campart, master weaver.
John-Baptist Caron, weaver, from Normandy.
Lewis Chauvet, master weaver.
Peter Chevenex, master weaver.
Peter Clement, weaver.
George Courtauld, weaver.
Charles Dalbiac (1726–1808), Spitalfields weaver, brother of James Dalbiac.
James Dalbiac (born 1720), Spitalfields master weaver.
Marc de Comans, tapestry weaver, associated with the Huguenot Gobelin dynasty.
François de la Planche, tapestry weaver, associated with the Huguenot Gobelin dynasty.
Jean-Jacques Delessert (1690), silk magnate.
William Deloney, silk weaver.
Laurens des Bouverie, weaving factory owner.
Peter Desert, weaver, from Normandy.
Jean-Henri Dollfus, founder of the Dollfus-Mieg textile company.
John Doozen,  journeyman weaver.
Isaac Dupree, master weaver.
Jean Dupree, journeyman weaver, ancestor of blues guitarist Keith Richards.
James Duthoit, weaver.
Peter Duthoit (1693-1764),  weaver.
Peter Duthoit Junior (1719-1777),  weaver.
Frédéric Engel-Dollfus (1818–1883), textile manufacturer and philanthropist.
Lewis Gasquet, weaver, from Nîmes.
Daniel Gobbee, master weaver.
Martin Grere, weaver.
Jean Guillemard, weaver, director of the French Hospital in London and ancestor of Lady Jane Franklin.
Abraham Jeudiome, master weaver.
John Lardant, silk weaver, had been a linen weaver in France, originally from Normandy.
John Larguier, head of Weavers' Company, with royal warrant covering London and surrounds.
Edward Le Heup, weaver.
Peter Lekeux, master weaver.
James Leman (1688–1745), silk designer.
Abraham Levesque, silk weaver, had been a worsted weaver in France, originally from Havre de Grace (Le Havre), Normandy.
James Massu, weaver.
Peter Merche, journeyman weaver.
Peter Merzeau, silk throwster.
Jean Mieg, textile manufacturer.
Peter Nouaille (1723-), weaver.
Christophe-Philippe Oberkampf (1738–1815), printed fabric manufacturer. 
Peter Abraham Ogier (1690-1757), Spitalfields master weaver, from Chassais L'Eglise in Bas Poitou.
Peter Ogier IV (1716-1754), master weaver, son of Peter Abraham Ogier.
Pierre Ogier (1711-1775), Spitalfields master weaver, from Chassais L'Eglise in Bas Poitou.
John Oliver, weaver.
James Ouvry (died 1748), master weaver.
John Ouvry (1707–1774), master weaver.
Peter Ouvry, weaver.
Charles-Christophe Peugeot, textile manufacturer (French Lutheran).
Jean-Jacques Peugeot, textile manufacturer (French Lutheran).
Richard Phillis, weaver.
Daniel Pilon, Spitalfields master weaver.
Jean Rondeau, master weaver.
Nicholas Rufine, weaver.
John Sabatier, master weaver.
Nicholas Schlumberger (1782–1867), cotton weaver.
Paul Schlumberger, textile manufacturer.
James Stilwell, master weaver, reputed to have woven Queen Victoria's coronation gown.
Samuel Totton, Spitalfields silk broker.
Charles Triquet, master weaver.
Paul Turpine, master weaver.
John Van Sommer (1705–1774), silk designer, master weaver.

Writers
Alfred Ainger (1837-1904), English writer and humorist, evangelical Anglican minister, honorary chaplain to Queen Victoria. 
Willibald Alexis (1798–1871), German writer.
Samuel Beckett (1906-1989), Irish novelist and playwright. 
Aegidius Jean Blignaut, South African writer.
Félix Bungener (1814-1874), writer.
Jan F. E. Celliers, South African poet, essayist, dramatist and reviewer.
Jean-Pierre Chabrol (1925-2001), novelist, descendant of Cevennois Camisards.
Frederick Chamier (1796-1870), British novelist.
André Chamson (1900–1983), novelist and pacifist. 
Samuel Chappuzeau (1625-1701), French author, poet, playwright.
Jacques Chardonne (real name Jacques Boutelleau) (1884–1968), writer.
Tracy Chevalier (1962–), American-British novelist. 
Valentin Conrart (1603-1675), writer.
Benjamin Constant (1767-1830), Swiss writer. 
André Cronje, South African religious writer, artist and missionary in Paris.
Agrippa d'Aubigné (1552-1630), French poet. 
Eustorg de Beaulieu, writer. Key work: Songs and coats of arms.
Walter De La Mare (1873–1956),  English poet and novelist.
Friedrich de la Motte Fouqué (1777-1843), German author. 
Pierre de La Primaudaye (1546–1619),  French writer. Key work: L'Academie Française.
Anne de La Roche-Guilhem (1644-1707), novelist.
Jean de La Taille, playwright. Key work: From the Art of Tragedy.
Georgette de Montenay (1540-1607), poetess. 
Marie Dentière (1495-1561), writer, theologian.
Catherine de Parthenay (1554–1631), poetess, playwright and mathematician, mother of Henri de Rohan. 
Daniel de Roulet, writer, pacifist, son of a pastor.
Guillaume de Salluste Du Bartas (1544–1590), French poet and courtier. 
Pierre des Maizeaux (1666–1745), author and translator.
Louis des Masures, writer.
Jean de Sponde (1557–1595), poet, later converted to Roman Catholicism.
Germaine de Staël (1766–1817), writer, daughter of Jacques Necker. 
Théophile de Viau (1590–1626), poet, playwright, convicted blasphemer, atheist born to a Huguenot family, committed suicide. 
Daphne du Maurier (1907-1989), English writer. 
George du Maurier (1834-1896), English author, Punch cartoonist.
Guy du Maurier (1865–1915), playwright, son of George du Maurier and uncle of Daphne du Maurier.
I. D. du Plessis (1900–1981), South African poet, member of the Dertigers group.
Jakob Daniël du Toit, South African poet.
Wilhelmina FitzClarence (1830-1906), English author.
Ian Fleming (1908-1964), British writer, Huguenot ancestry on his mother's side.
Theodor Fontane (1819-1898), German novelist, poet. 
Philip Morin Freneau, American poet
André Gide (1869–1951), French author, Nobel Prize winner. 
René Gillouin (1881-1971), right-wing intellectual, traditionalist, writer, literary critic, journalist, French politician, member of "Christianity Against Communism" and Pétainist (subsequently resigned due to Vichy's antisemitism), of Protestant religion.
Christian Giudicelli (1942-2022),  French novelist and literary critic, mother was a  Protestant from Nîmes.
Henriette Guizot de Witt (1829-1908), novelist, daughter of François Guizot.
Dashiell Hammett (1894–1961), American author, Marxist, descended from the De Schiells family. 
Maurice Hewlett (1861-1923), British novelist.
DuBose Heyward (1885-1940), American novelist, playwright, librettist. 
Françoise Marguerite Janiçon (1711-1789), writer.
Elsa Joubert, South African novelist.
Ode Krige (1939-), South African writer.
William Larminie, Irish poet.
Sheridan Le Fanu (1814-1873), Irish writer, Le Fanu family from Caen in Normandy.
Madeleine L'Engle, American author
David Le Sage (died 1650), poet from Languedoc.
Henry Wadsworth Longfellow, American poet
Pierre Loti (real name Louis Marie Julian Viaud) (1850–1923), French Orientalist writer.
D. F. Malherbe, South African novelist.
Harriet Martineau (1802-1876), English novelist and travel writer, educational and economic reformer, sociologist, atheist and advocate of Darwinian evolution, descended from a Huguenot family.
Charles Maturin (1780-1824), Irish Gothic writer and Church of Ireland clergyman, descendant of Huguenot and crippled Bastille prisoner, Gabriel Maturin. 
Edward Maturin (1812-1881), writer, son of Charles Maturin.
Charle-Pierre Naudé, South African poet.
Edith Olivier (1872—1948), British novelist, Christian, Conservative Party activist, opponent of Suffragette movement, founder of Wiltshire branch of Women's Land Army in 1916, daughter of the Dean of Wiltshire and related to Sir Laurence Olivier.
Jean Frédéric Ostervald (1663–1747), Bible translator.
Tom Paulin, British poet, critic.
James Planché, British dramatist, officer of arms
Damon Runyon (1880–1946), American author. 
Lou Andreas Salomé (1861–1937), Russian novelist and psychoanalyst.
Jean-Paul Sartre (1905-1980), author and philosopher, atheist born to Huguenot family.
Jean Schlumberger (1877–1968),  French novelist. 
Henry David Thoreau (1817-1862), American writer.
Noël Vesper (real name Noël Nougat)  (1882-1944), far-right writer, pastor, monarchist, member of Association Sully, a now-defunct Protestant royalist movement.
Dorothea Viehmann (1755–1816), German storyteller, source for the fairy tales of the Brothers Grimm. 
Louise von François (1817–1893), Prussian novelist, member of the Huguenot nobility-descended von François family. 
Gertrud von le Fort (1876–1971), German writer.
Malwida von Meysenbug (1816-1903), German writer, Nobel Prize for Literature nominee.
Ernst von Salomon (1902–1972), novelist, screenwriter, Freikorps fighter, far-right figure.
Evelyn Waugh (1903-1966), author, Roman Catholic with Huguenot ancestry.
John Greenleaf Whittier (1807–1892), American poet and advocate of the abolition of slavery.
Laura Ingalls Wilder (1867-1957), American writer.
Tennessee Williams (real name Thomas Lanier Williams) (1911-1983), American playwright, descended from the Sevier family.

Other
George Aufrère, draper, son of Israel Antoine Aufrère.
Sophie Blanchard (1778-1819), female hot air balloon pioneer, aeronautics advisor to Napoleon Bonaparte, first woman to die in an aviation disaster. 
Idelette Calvin (1506–1549), wife of Jean Calvin. 
Jean Pierre Chambon (died 1552), convicted criminal (robbery, murder), converted to Christ in prison.
John Debrett (1753-1822), publisher, founder of Debrett's, a compiler of reference books on the peerage, etiquette, lists of influential people and so forth, son of Jean Louys de Bret, a cook with Huguenot ancestry.
Marthe de Rocoulle (1659–1741), Huguenot governess of Frederick the Great.
Claude du Chastel (1554–1587), heiress and famous lover.
Alfred Dupont, draper.
Adolphe Landré (1828–1892), brewer of Berlin white beer, the production of which is attributed to the Huguenots.
Peter Le Heup (1699–1777), Director of Government Lotteries.
Philibert Le Sage, commissair of the Synod of Buxy.
Denis Ragunier, stenographer who transcribed Calvin's sermons.
Camille Seydoux (1982-), fashion stylist, sister of Léa Seydoux.

References

Huguenots, List of
Huguenots, List of